= Monaghan GAA =

Gaelic games governing body

- Irish: Muineachán
- Nickname(s): The Oriel County; The Farney Army
- Province: Ulster
- Dominant sport: Gaelic football
- Ground(s): St Tiernach's Park, Clones
- County colours: White Blue

County teams
- NFL: Division 1
- NHL: Division 4
- Hurling Championship: Nicky Rackard Cup
- Ladies' Gaelic football: Brendan Martin Cup
- Camogie: Máire Ní Chinnéide Cup

The Monaghan County Board of the Gaelic Athletic Association (GAA) (Irish: Cumann Luthchleas Gael Coiste Mhuineacháin) or Monaghan GAA is one of the 32 county boards of the GAA in Ireland, and is responsible for Gaelic games in County Monaghan and the Monaghan county football and hurling teams. Separate county boards are responsible for the promotion & development of handball, camogie and ladies' football within the county, as well as having responsibility for their representative county players/teams. The current team sponsor of Monaghan GAA is Activ8 Solar Energies.

== Football ==
=== Clubs ===
Clubs contest the Monaghan Senior Football Championship.

=== County team ===
Football was recorded in Inniskeen in 1706 in a poem. Monaghan were prominent in Ulster championship competitions during the period 1914–30 and one of the first Ulster counties to contest an All-Ireland final.

Monaghan beat Kildare in a semi-final to reach the 1930 All-Ireland Senior Football Championship Final, where Kerry beat them by 3–11 to 0-2 without their goalkeeper touching the ball.

In 1979 the Monaghan team won the Ulster Senior Football Championship for the first time in 41 years with a defeat of Donegal. In the final Monaghan Kieran Finlay scored 1-09, which was a record in an Ulster final for 20 years, until Armagh's Oisin McConville bettered it with a 2-07 tally against Down in 1999. They also won the Dr McKenna Cup in 1979. Victories in the Ceannarus Tournament against Roscommon and Dublin in 1979 brought gloss to the county's finest year on the football field in almost half a century. In the All-Ireland Senior Football Championship 1979 semi-final at Croke Park, Monaghan were again beaten by Kerry, 5–14 to 0-07.

In 1984 the Centenary Cup final was reached following wins over Limerick, Mayo, Offaly (quarter final) and Derry (semi-final after extra time) The Offaly and Derry games were played in Croke Park as was the final against Meath which Monaghan lost by 0–10 to 0-08. Monaghan also won Division 3 of the National Football League that year and lost to Meath in the quarterfinal.

1985 was the county's most successful year to date when a National Football League final victory against Armagh in 1985 created a momentum that peaked in 1985 when future Monaghan manager Eamonn McEneaney kicked one of the most spectacular equalizing points in many years from 48 metres out near the sideline beside the Hogan Stand to draw the All-Ireland semi-final against Kerry on a scoreline of Monaghan 2–09 to Kerry's 1-12. Kerry won the replay on a 2–09 to 0–10 score. That National football league title of 1985 was won by Monaghan on a 1–11 to 0–09 score against pre-match favourites Armagh. The game was effectively settled by an Eamon McEneaney penalty in the first half when referee John Gough from Antrim decided that an Armagh defender had taken too many steps in his own penalty area. Armagh got to within a point in the second half but a flurry of exceptional long range points from Bernie Murray, Eamon McEneaney and Ray McCarron brought the trophy to Monaghan for the first time.

That year's Ulster Senior Football Championship was also a stirring success. An easy first round victory over Donegal in Castleblayney, marked by a spectacular Eamon Murphy goal, followed by a lucky draw against Armagh in the semi-final and one-point victory in the replay saw Monaghan meet Derry in the Ulster Senior Football Championship final. The first day against Armagh, Monaghan relied on pure luck to survive for a draw, as Armagh dominated the game from start to finish, doing everything but score. Paddy Linden saved a penalty, while and Armagh player saw the line barely 30 seconds after coming onto the field as a substitute, following an apparent high tackle on Declan Flanagan. The replay was a better match but a late Armagh goal had Monaghan concerned. However they won by 1–11 to 2-07.

In the Ulster final against Derry Eamon McEneaney helped himself to 2-04 as Monaghan recorded and easy 2–09 to 0–08 win. As stated the drawn All-Ireland semi-final against Kerry was a thriller but the absence of David Byrne through injury in the second half probably cost Monaghan victory. Eamon McEneaney's last gasp equaliser was something special but in the replay Kerry were ruthless and despite serious Monaghan pressure the Kingdom won by 5 points. Monaghan's run that year was something special considering the fact that they were missing Declan Loughman, Gerry Hoey and Bernie Murray (all with broken legs). All three were prominent in the National Football League win over Armagh while they would form the spine of the Ulster Senior Football Championship winning side of 1988.

Monaghan reached the 1986 National Football League final but this time the opposition was Laois. Played in front of over 30,000 supporters the Laoismen edged out Monaghan by 2–06 to 2-05. Monaghan's championship run in 1986 consisted of a draw against Down in Castleblayney thanks to a last gap Eamon McEneaney free while in the replay Down emerged victors in Newcastle on a 2–11 to 0–11 score. A promising season was over before it had begun.

In 1987, Monaghan reached the National Football League semi-final again where they played out a thrilling game against Kerry at Croke Park. A superb second half performance against the wind had Monaghan leading by a couple of points near the end but a Pat Spillane goal and a late point by Mikey Sheehy saw the Kingdom win by 2–11 to 2-09. Monaghan's goals came from Mick O'Dowd and Hugo Clerkin. Disappointment followed in the Ulster championship with a shock 0–14 to 0–12 loss to Cavan in Breffni Park. The early promise of 1985 looked over as two successive seasons of flattering to deceive left the county in a state of gloom.

In 1988, the team reached the National Football League semi-final again but ended in a 4–12 to 1-08 drubbing from Dublin at Croke Park. However a good league run prior to that had rescued a season where relegation to Division 2 of the National Football League looked a distinct possibility. A change in management during that league run also added to the merit of the achievement. The 1988 All Ireland semi-final against Cork was even less memorable. Monaghan were holding out against a gale-force wind in the first half and were 0–08 to 0-01 behind at the break. Goalkeeper Paddy Linden had saved a penalty from Larry Tompkins. Two early second half points brought Monaghan to within 5 points. A highly controversial goal following an apparent foul on Monaghan's Brendan Murray rocked the Monaghan revival and Cork took over. Linden's display in that match was a significant factor in him being the first Ulster goalkeeper to receive an All-star award that year. As stated the game was decided when Cork scored a dubious goal and the All-Ireland dream died again. With that defeat, the successful team of the mid 80s started to break up.

However 1988 will be remembered for the Ulster title win over Tyrone when a "Nudie" Hughes goal following a fumble by Tyrone keeper Aidan Skelton saw Monaghan win by 1–10 to 0-11. An interesting facet of this particular game was that all Monaghan's scores came from play. Previous wins over Cavan (0-16 to 0-14), again marked by a 5 star performance from Nudie Hughes and Down (1-11 to 0-09) had brought Monaghan to the Ulster final.

In 1989 Monaghan scraped home with an 0–08 to 0–05 win against Antrim in Casement Park, Belfast, where the homesters literally kicked the game away. Down ended Monaghan's run in Castleblayney a few weeks later.

The 1990s and early part of the 2000s were lean years for the county.

The National Football League run of 1998 was also memorable for Monaghan when they surprisingly qualified from a "group of death" that included Tyrone, Dublin, Kerry, Cavan and Sligo to qualify for the quarter-finals against Down in Croke Park. Behind at one stage early in the second half by 1–05 to 0-02, the Down goal scored by James Mc Cartan, a rousing rally with goals by Darren Swift and Stephen Mc Ginnitty and a spectacular individual point by Peter Duffy saw Monaghan cause a mild surprise with a 2–05 to 1–06 win. The semi final against Derry was less memorable and defeat on a score of 1–12 to 0-08 was the result. The game had a bit of controversy too when a Mark Daly goal was disallowed and a Monaghan player was sent off. It set the tone for a niggly Ulster Senior Football Championship meeting between both sides a few weeks later. Monaghan's Edwin Murphy was sent off on the advice of a linesman but video evidence subsequently cleared him. However it didn't stop Monaghan suffering a heavy defeat on the day to Derry.

2005 was another memorable year for the county when they contested the Division 2 National Football League final against Meath at Croke Park. However it took a last gasp point from Paul Finlay in the final league game against Longford in Clones to earn a draw and automatic promotion to Division 1 for the first time in 18 years. The league semi final against Derry in Clones was also a thriller from a Monaghan perspective. A goal within 15 seconds of the throw in by Tommy Freeman set Monaghan on their way and despite Rory Woods being sent off Monaghan held out for a 1–13 to 1–11 win.

The NFL Division 2 final was a thrilling ding dong battle between two well match sides and was full of top drawer scores. It had the 40,000+ crowd on their feet from start to finish. Fortunes ebbed and flowed between both sides and in injury time Meath looked like holding onto a 2-point victory. However a Paul Finlay free with the last kick of the game (sounds familiar) from 40 yards out was deflected into the Meath net by a Meath player and Monaghan edged out 3–13 to 3-12 winners. This game preceded the National Football League final which saw Armagh overcome Wexford to gain their first league title. This marked Monaghan's first visit to Croke Park in 7 years, that resulting in a 1–12 to 0–08 defeat in a National Football League semi-final to Derry back in 1998.

Derry gained revenge in the Ulster Senior Football Championship with a 1–17 to 2–08 win, but "back door" wins over London, Wexford and Louth brought Monaghan to a last 12 meeting with eventual All-Ireland champions Tyrone in Croke Park. In a very entertaining game the tactic of isolating Tommy Freeman up front caused havoc for Tyrone in the first 25 minutes as they leaked 1-05, the goal a spectacular effort from Freeman. However a shrewd management move from Tyrone resulted in a player being brought back to double mark Freeman and the Farney threat was quashed. On the day Monaghan had no plan "B" and Tyrone took over. They ran out flattering 2–14 to 1-07 winners in the end, limiting Monaghan to a single point from a free in the second half. All the pre-match hype surrounded the question as to whether or not Tyrone's Ryan McMenamin would be playing, having been suspended following an incident in the Ulster final. He missed the game but later returned for the quarter-final against Dublin. Freeman's exploits in the summer of 2005 brought him an All-star nomination and an "Irish News" Ulster All star award on the "40".

2006 saw Monaghan compete in Division 1A of the National Football League but apart from a win over Dublin and a draw with Offaly, there was little else to celebrate despite battling displays against Kerry and Tyrone and relegation followed in the spring.

In the 2013 championship, Monaghan were handed a "favorable" draw. They were drawn against Antrim in the first round in Casement Park, Belfast. Monaghan had previously brushed aside the Antrim men in the National League. Monaghan started shakily and took a while to get going. They survived some scares but the free taking of Conor McManus powered them over the line 0–11 to 0–6. In the Ulster semi final Monaghan were pitted against local neighbours Cavan. The game was a tight affair with both teams trading scores tit for tat. In the end it finished on a score of 1–11 to 0-13. Coming into the final Monaghan faced the reigning Ulster and All Ireland Champions, Donegal. Nobody had given Monaghan a hope coming into the final but the Farney men took the Tir Chonaill boys by surprise rushing into a 4–0 lead while also keeping Donegal scoreless for 32 minutes. Drew Wylie and Colin Walshe were outstanding marking Colm McFadden and Paddy Mcbrearty respectively. At half time Monaghan led 05–02. Despite the 3 point advantage Donegal were still much fancied but Kieran Hughes stuck over 3 quick points in succession to buffer the Farney Men's advantage. With Vinny Corey's rough housing of Michael Murphy, Donegal failed to get going. Monaghan beat Donegal at their own game using the blanket defence system while Darren Hughes and Conor McManus remained outstanding. It was tight up until the last 10 minutes when Monaghan added some scores to put a gloss on the scoreline. Tommy Freeman one of the greatest servants of Monaghan coming off the bench and firing over the last point. At the end of the game Monaghan had won their first Ulster Senior Football Championship in 25 years. This result was coupled with the Minors superb comeback win earlier in the day defeating Tyrone to complete an historic double. Owen Lennon lifted the Anglo Celt Cup as no Monaghan Captain had done for 25 years.

== Handball ==
In addition to football, handball (Gaelic handball) has a strong tradition within the county. Monaghan has enjoyed several major national successes in recent years in handball with Gavin Coyle winning three GAA Handball All Ireland 40×20 Singles titles over the past few years. Other notable Monaghan Handball players include Darren Doherty who has achieved several major titles over the last 10+ years. The sport of handball continues to grow within the county, with most GAA clubs providing GAA Handball facilities, namely in the form of 40x20, Wallball/One-wall and/or 60x30 handball courts. New handball courts have been built in recent years with Truagh Gaels GAA Club (new 40x20 court), Scotstown GAA Club (new Wallball court) & Bawn GAA Handball Club (new 40x20 court) all building new courts respectively. Additionally, St Macartan's College have recently refurbished their handball courts, boasting the only combined dual 60x30 and 40x20 handball courts facility in Ireland. Beech Hill College have also added new Wallball courts to their sports facilities.

== Hurling ==
Football is the dominant GAA sport in Monaghan but the county also competes in hurling.

Its clubs contest the Monaghan Senior Hurling Championship.

Monaghan county teams have the following achievements in hurling.

- Lory Meagher Cup: 1
  - 2023
- All-Ireland Junior Hurling Championships: 1
  - 1997
- Ulster Senior Hurling Championships: 2
  - 1914, 1915
- Ulster Junior Hurling Championships: 6
  - 1971, 1986, 1987, 1988, 1997, 1998
- National Hurling League Division 4 : 5
  - 1982, 1986, 1989, 2008, 2010

== Ladies' football ==
Vourneen Quigley won the 2002 ladies' All-Ireland Kick Fada Championship.

Monaghan have the following achievements in ladies' football.

- All-Ireland Senior Ladies' Football Championships: 2
  - 1996, 1997
- All-Ireland Under-18 Ladies' Football Championships: 3
  - 1994, 1995, 1999
- All-Ireland Junior Ladies' Football Championships: 1
  - 1992

All Stars (ladies' football)

- Jenny Greenan 7 (1994, 1995, 1996, 1997, 1998, 2001, 2002)
- Brenda Mc Anespie 3 (1996, 1997, 1999)
- Edel Byrne 3 (1998, 1999, 2002)
- Niamh Kindlon 3 (1998, 2002, 2008)
- Mairead Kelly 2 (1996, 1997)
- Margaret Kierans 2 (1996, 1998)
- Elieen Mc Elvaney 2 (1997, 1998)
- Christine O'Reilly 2 (2004, 2011)
- Ciara McAnespie 2 (2009, 2011)
- Linda Farrelly 1 (1996)
- Angela Larkin 1 (1997)
- Orla Callan 1 (2002)
- Therese McNally 1 (2011)
- Grainne McNally 2 (2011, 2013)
- Christina Reilly 1 (2012)
- Cathriona McConnell 1 (2012)
- Sharon Courtney 1 (2013)
- Caoimhe Mohan 1 (2013)
- Cora Courtney 1 (2013)

== Camogie ==
Felix Donnelly from Latton established the first camogie county board in Monaghan in 1933. Anne Sherry from Ballybay was a high scoring forward on the UCD Ashbourne Cup winning team in 1961.

Monaghan won the Máire Ní Chinnéide Cup in 2010 and 2011 having unsuccessfully contested the finals of 2006 and 2007. Mary Lynch served as president of the Camogie Association). Bernie Byrne refereed the All Ireland senior finals of 1966.

In 2026, Monaghan returned to competitive inter-county camogie after a break of 15 years and won the Nancy MurrayCup.
