= Irish Wallball Nationals =

Annual handball tournament in Ireland

- Venue: Various (County Sligo, County Mayo, County Roscommon)
- Location: County Roscommon (2022-present)
- Date: early July (Annual Tournament)
- Competitors: 400 (2019)
- Website: http://gaahandball.ie

Champions
- Men: C. McElduff (2022)
- Women: C. Casey (2022)

The Irish Wallball Nationals is a wallball/one-wall handball tournament held annually in Ireland in early July. The tournament is the main wallball/One-wall handball on the Irish handball calendar.

== Events and venues ==
The Nationals feature men's and women's singles; with Senior/Open, B, C, 23 and under (23&U), 19 and under (19&U), Masters and Juvenile grades. Since 2009, the games are normally held in a 5-court venue in the Sports Arena at Breaffy House Hotel in Castlebar. For 2022, the Irish Wallball Nationals were planned for Roscommon venues as the Breaffy House Sports Arena was unavailable.

== Management ==
The Irish Wallball Nationals is managed by GAA Handball, formerly the Irish Handball Council.

== History ==
The event was first played in County Meath in 1997 before moving to Sligo where it was hosted for several years before moving to its current, multi-court venue, Breaffy House Hotel in County Mayo in 2009. The 2022 Nationals were scheduled to take place across three Roscommon venues - Kilglass GAC, Strokestown CS, and the Convent of Mercy Roscommon, as Breaffy House Arena is unavailable to host the tournament this year. The three-court venue in Kilglass was set as the main venue for finals / premier grades.

== Champions ==
Men's Open:

Year	Champion	County
1997	P. Hall	Dublin
1998	R. McCarthy Snr	Westmeath
1999	D. King	Carlow
2000	D. Keegan	Mayo
2001	D. King	Carlow
2002	D. King	Carlow
2003	C. Browne	Meath
2004	D. Keegan	Mayo
2005	D. King	Carlow
2006	R. McCarthy	Westmeath
2007	C. Shanks	Armagh
2008	P. Brady	Cavan
2009	C. Shanks	Armagh
2010	C. Shanks	Armagh
2011	H. Mendez	Puerto Rico
2012	R. McCarthy	Westmeath
2013	H. Mendez	Puerto Rico
2014	C. McElduff	Tyrone
2015	C. McElduff	Tyrone
2016	M. Mulkerrins	Galway
2017	C. McElduff	Tyrone
2018	C. McElduff	Tyrone
2019	M. Mulkerrins	Galway
2020	The competition did not take place in 2020 due to the COVID-19 coronavirus pandemic.	
2021	The competition did not take place in 2021 due to the COVID-19 coronavirus pandemic.	
2022	C. McElduff	Tyrone

Women's Open:

Year	Champion	County
1997	F. Mee	Roscommon
1998	L. Doolan	Roscommon
1999	No Competition	
2000	No Competition	
2001	No Competition	
2002	No Competition	
2003	No Competition	
2004	M. Kennedy	Galway
2005	F. O'Reilly	Limerick
2006	M. Rushe	Roscommon
2007	A. Prendiville	Kerry
2008	M. Rushe	Roscommon
2009	M. Rushe	Roscommon
2010	L. Havern	Down
2011	K. McConney	United States
2012	L. Havern	Down
2013	L. Havern	Down
2014	M. McMahon	Limerick
2015	C. Casey	Cork
2016	L. Havern	Down
2017	M. McMahon	Limerick
2018	M. McMahon	Limerick
2019	C. Ni Churraoin	Galway
2020	The competition did not take place in 2020 due to the COVID-19 coronavirus pandemic.	
2021	The competition did not take place in 2021 due to the COVID-19 coronavirus pandemic.	
2022	C. Casey	Cork

== See also ==
- European 1-Wall Tour
- Handball International Championships
- GAA Handball
- United States Handball Association
- Valencian Pilota Federation (Fedpival)
- Gaelic handball
- American handball
- Basque pelota
- Pêl-Law (Welsh handball)
- Valencian frontó
