= Croke Park =

Stadium in Dublin, Ireland

- Páirc an Chrócaigh
- Croker

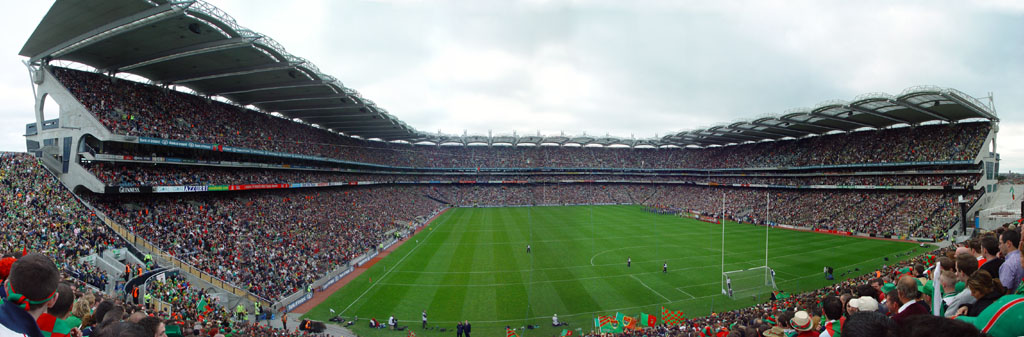
- Interactive map of Croke Park
- Location: Dublin, Ireland
- Coordinates: 53°21′39″N 6°15′04″W
- Owner: GAA
- Capacity: 82,300 (total); 69,100 (seated); 13,200 (terraced)
- Surface: Soil pitch
- Record attendance: 90,556 (Down–Offaly, 24 September 1961)
- Field size: 145m x 88m
- Public transit: Drumcondra railway station

Construction
- Groundbreaking: 1880
- Opened: 1884; 142 years ago
- Renovated: 2004
- Cost: €266 million (2004 renovation)
- Architect: Gilroy McMahon
- Project managers: Seamus Monahan & Partners
- Structural engineers: Horgan Lynch & Partners

Tenants
- Gaelic Athletic Association; Ireland national rugby union team (2007–2010); Republic of Ireland national football team (2007–2010)

Website
- www.crokepark.ie

Croke Park (Irish: Páirc an Chrócaigh, IPA: [ˈpˠaːɾʲc ə ˈxɾˠoːkəj]) is a Gaelic games stadium in Dublin, Ireland. Named after Archbishop Thomas Croke, it is referred to as Croker by GAA fans and locals. It is the headquarters of the Gaelic Athletic Association (GAA). Since 1891 the site has been used by the GAA to host Gaelic sports, including the annual All-Ireland finals in Gaelic football and hurling.

A major expansion and redevelopment of the stadium ran from 1991 to 2005, raising capacity to its current 82,300 spectators. This makes Croke Park the fourth-largest stadium in Europe, and the largest not usually used for association football in Europe.

Other events held at the stadium include the opening and closing ceremonies of the 2003 Special Olympics, and numerous musical concerts. In 2012, Irish pop group Westlife sold out the stadium in a record-breaking time: less than 5 minutes. From 2007 to 2010, Croke Park hosted home matches of the Ireland national rugby union team and the Republic of Ireland national football team, while their new Aviva Stadium was constructed. This use of Croke Park for non-Gaelic sports was controversial and required temporary changes to GAA rules. In June 2012, the stadium hosted the closing ceremony of the 50th International Eucharistic Congress during which Pope Benedict XVI gave an address over a video link.

== City and Suburban Racecourse ==
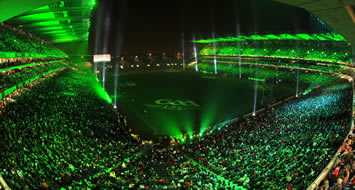
A fireworks and light display was held in Croke Park in front of 79,161 fans on Saturday 31 January 2009 to mark the GAA's 125th anniversary

The area now known as Croke Park was owned in the 1880s by Maurice Butterly and known as the City and Suburban Racecourse, or Jones' Road sports ground. From 1893 it was also used by the Bohemian Football Club. In 1891 Butterly's field hosted Athletics meetings organised by the GAA.

== History ==
Recognising the potential of the Jones' Road sports ground, a journalist and GAA member, Frank Dineen, borrowed much of the £3,250 asking price and bought the ground in 1908. In 1913 the GAA came into exclusive ownership of the plot when they purchased it from Dineen for £3,500. The ground was then renamed Croke Park in honour of Archbishop Thomas Croke, one of the GAA's first patrons.

In 1913, Croke Park only had one stand on what is now known as the Hogan Stand side and grassy banks all round. In 1917, a grassy hill was constructed on the railway end of Croke Park to afford patrons a better view of the pitch. This terrace was known originally as Hill 60, after a battle in the Gallipoli Campaign, in which The Royal Dublin Fusiliers, Munster Fusiliers and Connaught Rangers fought. It was later renamed Hill 16 in memory of the 1916 Easter Rising. It is erroneously said to have been built from the ruins of the GPO but was constructed the previous year in 1915.

In 1918, the GAA set out to create a high-capacity stadium at Croke Park. Following the Hogan Stand, the Cusack Stand, named after Michael Cusack from Clare (who founded the GAA and served as its first secretary), was built in 1927. 1936 saw the first double-deck Cusack Stand open with 5,000 seats, and concrete terracing being constructed on Hill 16. In 1952 the Nally Stand was built in memorial of Pat Nally, another of the GAA founders. Seven years later, to celebrate the 75th anniversary of the GAA, the first cantilevered "New Hogan Stand" was opened.

The highest attendance ever recorded at an All-Ireland Senior Football Championship Final was 90,556 for Offaly v Down in 1961. Since the introduction of seating to the Cusack Stand in 1966, the largest crowd recorded has been 84,516.

=== Bloody Sunday ===
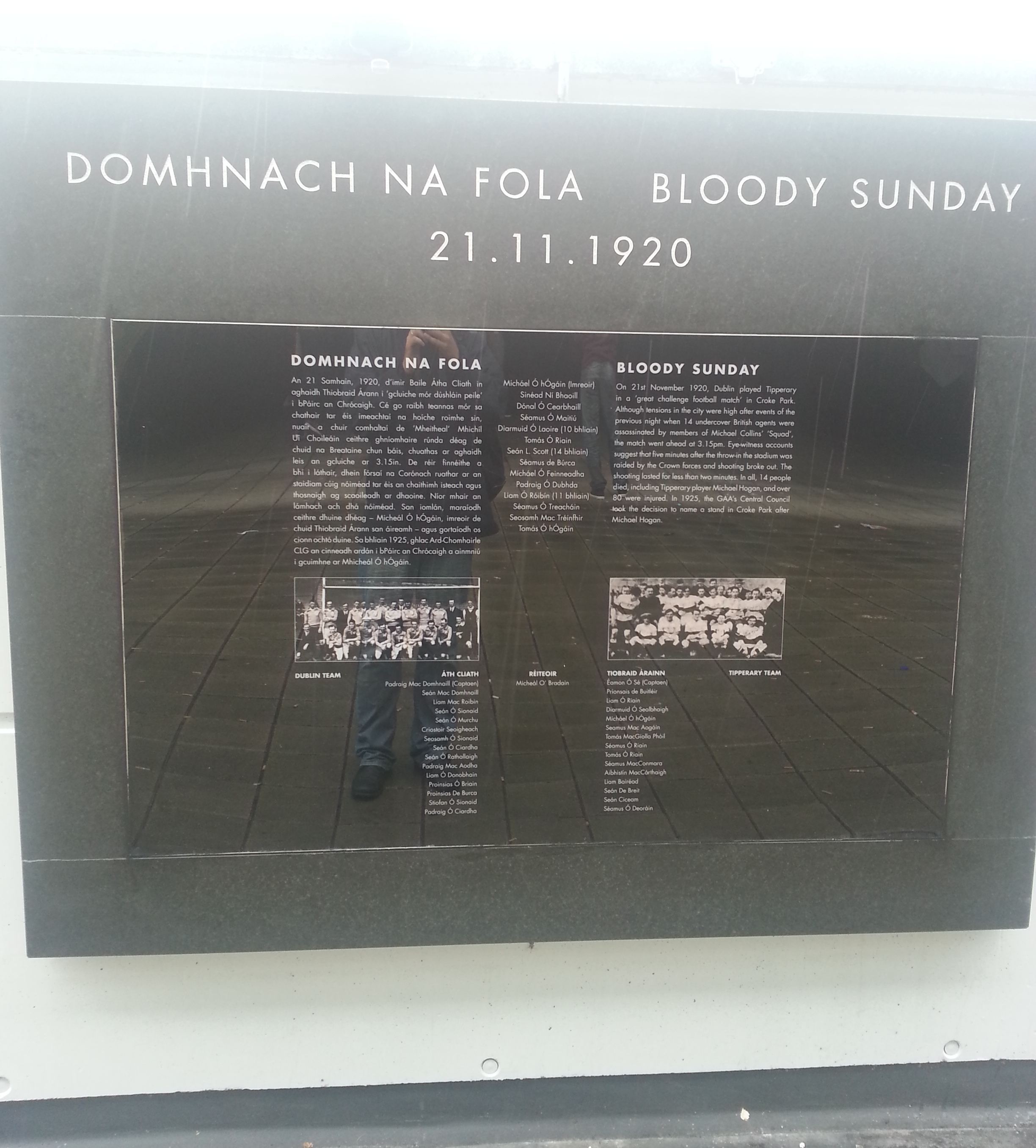
Bloody Sunday remembrance plaque

On 21 November 1920, during the Irish War of Independence, Croke Park was the scene of a massacre perpetrated by the Auxiliary Division of the Royal Irish Constabulary (RIC). The RIC entered the ground and began shooting into the crowd, killing or fatally wounding 14 civilians during a Dublin-Tipperary Gaelic football match. The dead included 13 spectators and Tipperary player Michael Hogan. Posthumously, the Hogan Stand, built in 1924, was named in his honour. Those shootings, on the day which became known as Bloody Sunday, were a reprisal for the killing of 15 people associated with the Cairo Gang, a group of British intelligence officers, by Michael Collins' "Squad" earlier that day.

=== Dublin Rodeo ===
In 1924, American rodeo promoter, Tex Austin, staged the Dublin Rodeo, Ireland's first professional rodeo at Croke Park Stadium. For seven days, with two shows each day from 18 to 24 August, sell-out crowds saw cowboys and cowgirls from Canada, the United States, Mexico, Argentina and Australia compete for rodeo championship titles. Canadian bronc riders such as Andy Lund and his brother Art Lund, trick riders such as Ted Elder and Vera McGinnis were among the contestants. British Pathe filmed some of the rodeo events.

== Stadium redesign ==
In 1984 the organisation decided to investigate ways to increase the capacity of the old stadium. The design for an 80,000-capacity stadium was completed in 1991. Gaelic sports have special requirements as they take place on a large field. A specific requirement was to ensure the spectators were not too far from the field of play. This resulted in the three-tier design from which viewing games is possible: the main concourse, a premium level incorporating hospitality facilities and an upper concourse. The premium level contains restaurants, bars and conference areas. The project was split into four phases over a 14-year period. Such was the importance of Croke Park to the GAA for hosting big games, that the stadium did not close during redevelopment. During each phase, different parts of the ground were redeveloped, while leaving the rest of the stadium open. Big games, including the annual All-Ireland Hurling and Football finals, were played in the stadium throughout the development.

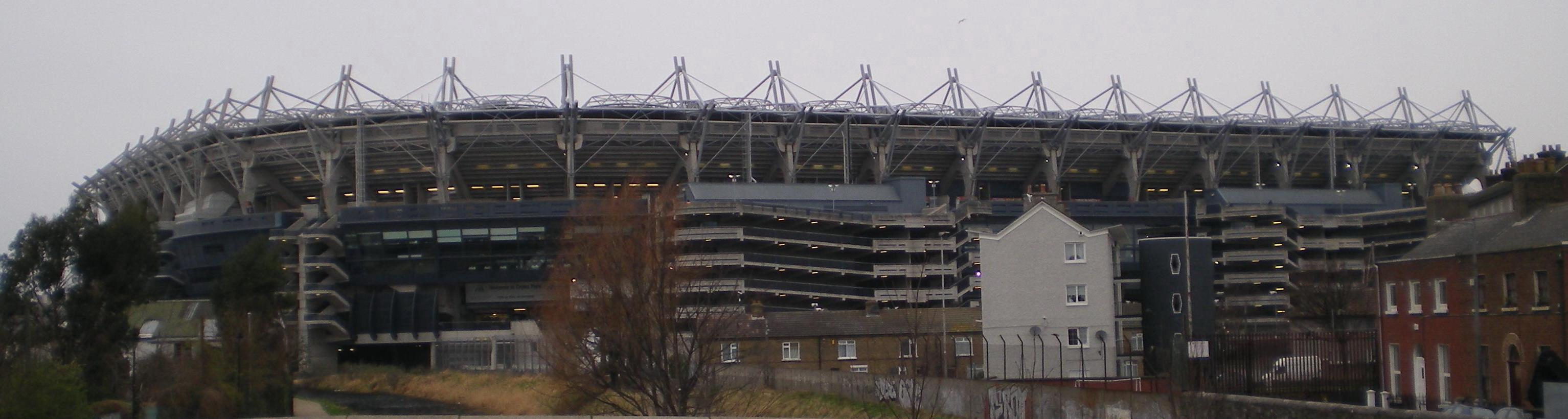
The outside of the Cusack Stand

=== Phase one – New Cusack Stand ===
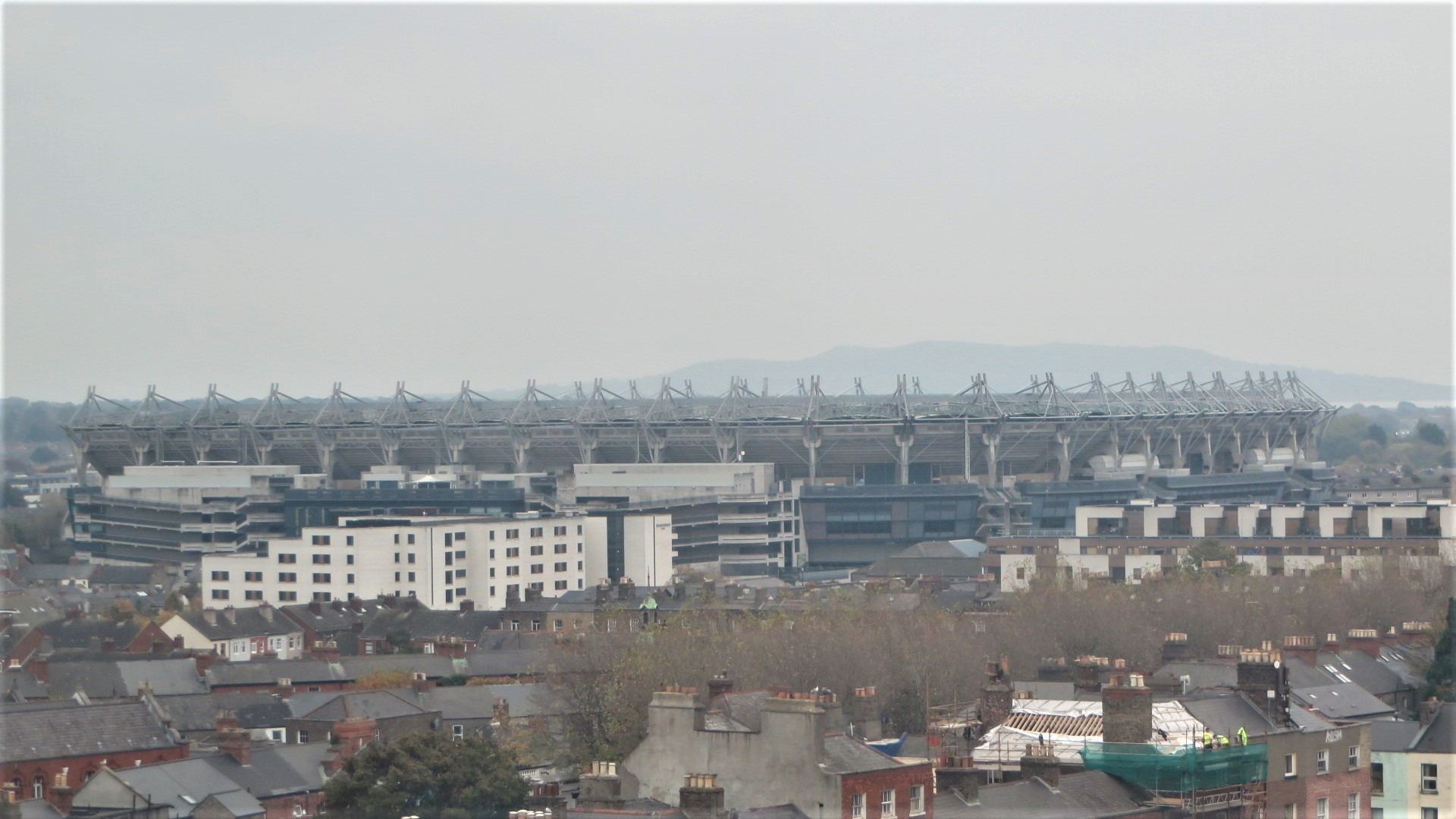
The stadium viewed from Phibsborough

The first phase of construction was to build a replacement for Croke Park's Cusack Stand. A lower deck opened for use in 1994. The upper deck opened in 1995. Completed at a cost of £35 million, the new stand is 180 metres long, 35 metres high, has a capacity for 27,000 people and contains 46 hospitality suites. The new Cusack Stand contains three tiers from which viewing games is possible: the main concourse, a premium level incorporating hospitality facilities and finally an upper concourse. One end of the pitch was closer to the stand after this phase, as the process of slightly re-aligning the pitch during the redevelopment of the stadium began. The works were carried out by Sisk Group.

=== Phase two – Davin Stand ===
Phase Two of the development started in late 1998 and involved extending the new Cusack Stand to replace the existing Canal End terrace. It involved reacquiring a rugby pitch that had been sold to Belvedere College in 1910 by Frank Dineen. In payment and part exchange, the college was given the nearby Distillery Road sports grounds.

It is now known as The Davin Stand (Irish: Ardán Dáimhím), after Maurice Davin, the first president of the GAA. This phase also saw the creation of a tunnel which was later named the Ali tunnel in honour of Muhammad Ali and his fight against Al Lewis in July 1972 in Croke Park.

=== Phase three – Hogan Stand ===
Phase Three saw the building of the new Hogan Stand. This required a greater variety of spectator categories to be accommodated including general spectators, corporate patrons, VIPs, broadcast and media services and operation staff. Extras included a fitted-out mezzanine level for VIP and Ard Comhairle (Where the dignitaries sit) along with a top-level press media facility. The end of Phase Three took the total spectator capacity of Croke Park to 82,000.

The 1999 All-Ireland Senior Football Championship Final was the last to be held with the old Hogan Stand in place.

=== Phase four – Nally Stand & Nally End/Dineen Hill 16 terrace ===
After the 2003 Special Olympics, construction began in September 2003 on the final phase, Phase Four. This involved the redevelopment of the Nally Stand, named after the athlete Pat Nally, and Hill 16 into a new Nally End/Dineen Hill 16 terrace. While the name Nally had been used for the stand it replaced, the use of the name Dineen was new, and was in honour of Frank Dineen, who bought the original stadium for the GAA in 1908, giving it to them in 1913. The old Nally Stand was taken away and reassembled in Pairc Colmcille, home of Carrickmore GAA in County Tyrone.

The phase four development was officially opened by the then GAA President Seán Kelly on 14 March 2005. For logistical reasons (and, to a degree, historical reasons), and also to provide cheaper high-capacity space, the area is a terrace rather than a seated stand, the only remaining standing room in Croke Park. Unlike the previous Hill, the new terrace was divided into separate sections – Hill A (Cusack Stand side), Hill B (behind the goals) and the Nally terrace (on the site of the old Nally Stand). The fully redeveloped Hill has a capacity of around 13,200, bringing the overall capacity of the stadium to 82,300. This made the stadium the second biggest in Europe at the time after the Camp Nou, Barcelona. The presence of terracing meant that for the brief period when Croke Park hosted international association football during 2007–2009, the capacity was reduced to approximately 73,500, due to FIFA's statutes stating that competitive games must be played in all-seater stadiums.

== Pitch ==
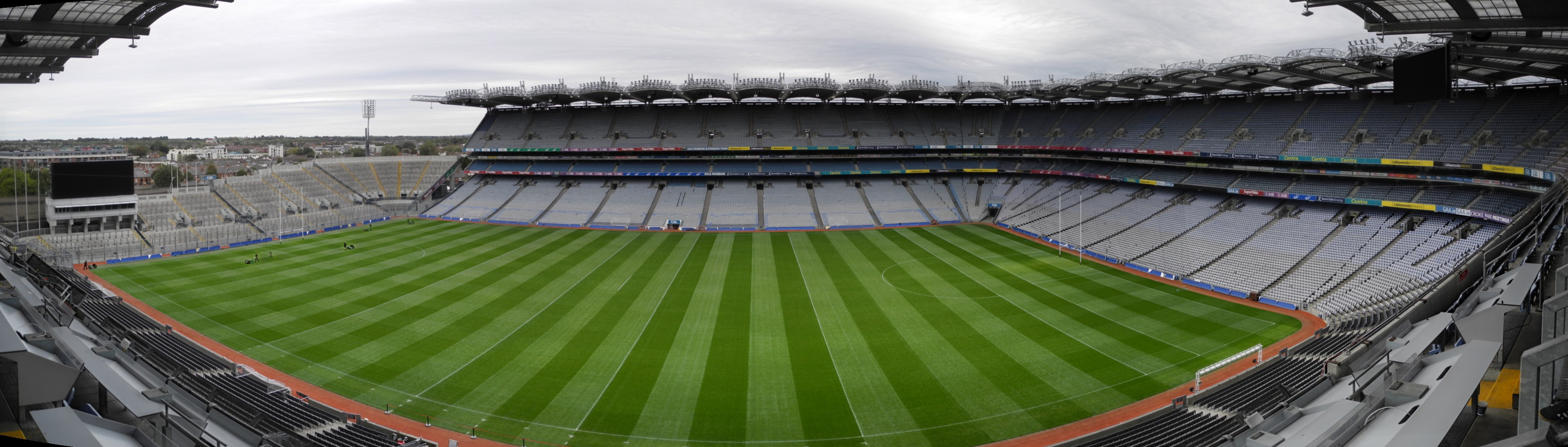
Panorama of Croke Park.

The pitch in Croke Park is a soil pitch that replaced the Desso GrassMaster pitch laid in 2002. This replacement was made after several complaints by players and managers that the pitch was excessively hard and far too slippery.

Since January 2006, a special growth and lighting system called the SGL Concept has been used to assist grass growing conditions, even in the winter months. The system, created by Dutch company SGL (Stadium Grow Lighting), helps in controlling and managing all pitch growth factors, such as light, temperature, CO_{2}, water, air and nutrients.

=== Floodlighting ===
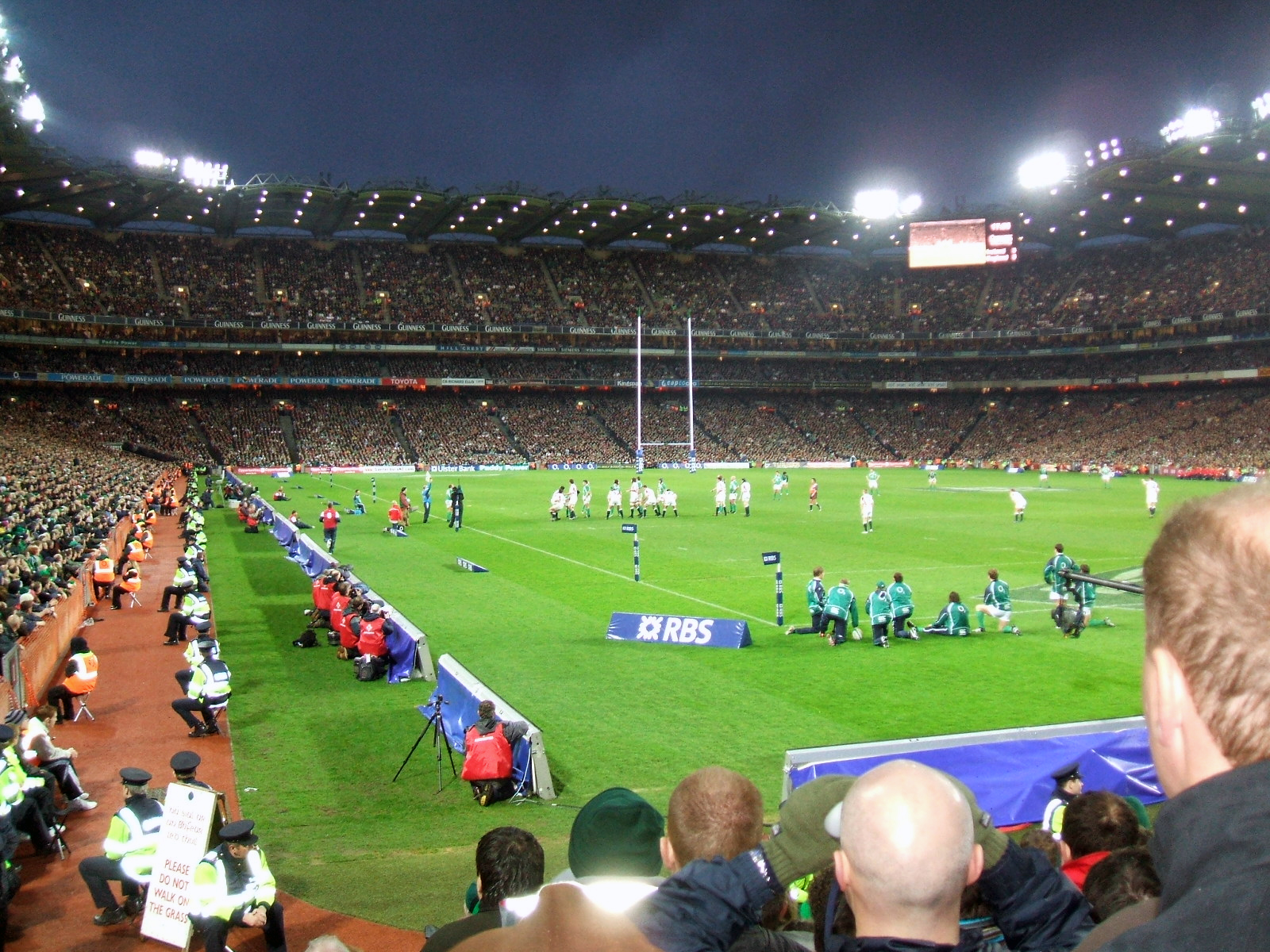
Croke Park floodlights in use during Six Nations Championship match

With the 2007 Six Nations clash with France and possibly other matches in subsequent years requiring lighting the GAA installed floodlights in the stadium (after planning permission was granted). Indeed, many other GAA grounds around the country have started to erect floodlights as the organisation starts to hold games in the evenings, whereas traditionally major matches were played almost exclusively on Sunday afternoons. The first game to be played under these lights at Croke Park was a National Football League Division One match between Dublin and Tyrone on 3 February 2007 with Tyrone winning in front of a capacity crowd of over 81,000 – which remains a record attendance for a National League game, with Ireland's Six Nations match with France following on 11 February. Temporary floodlights were installed for the American Bowl game between Chicago Bears and Pittsburgh Steelers on the pitch in 1997, and again for the 2003 Special Olympics.

== Concerts ==
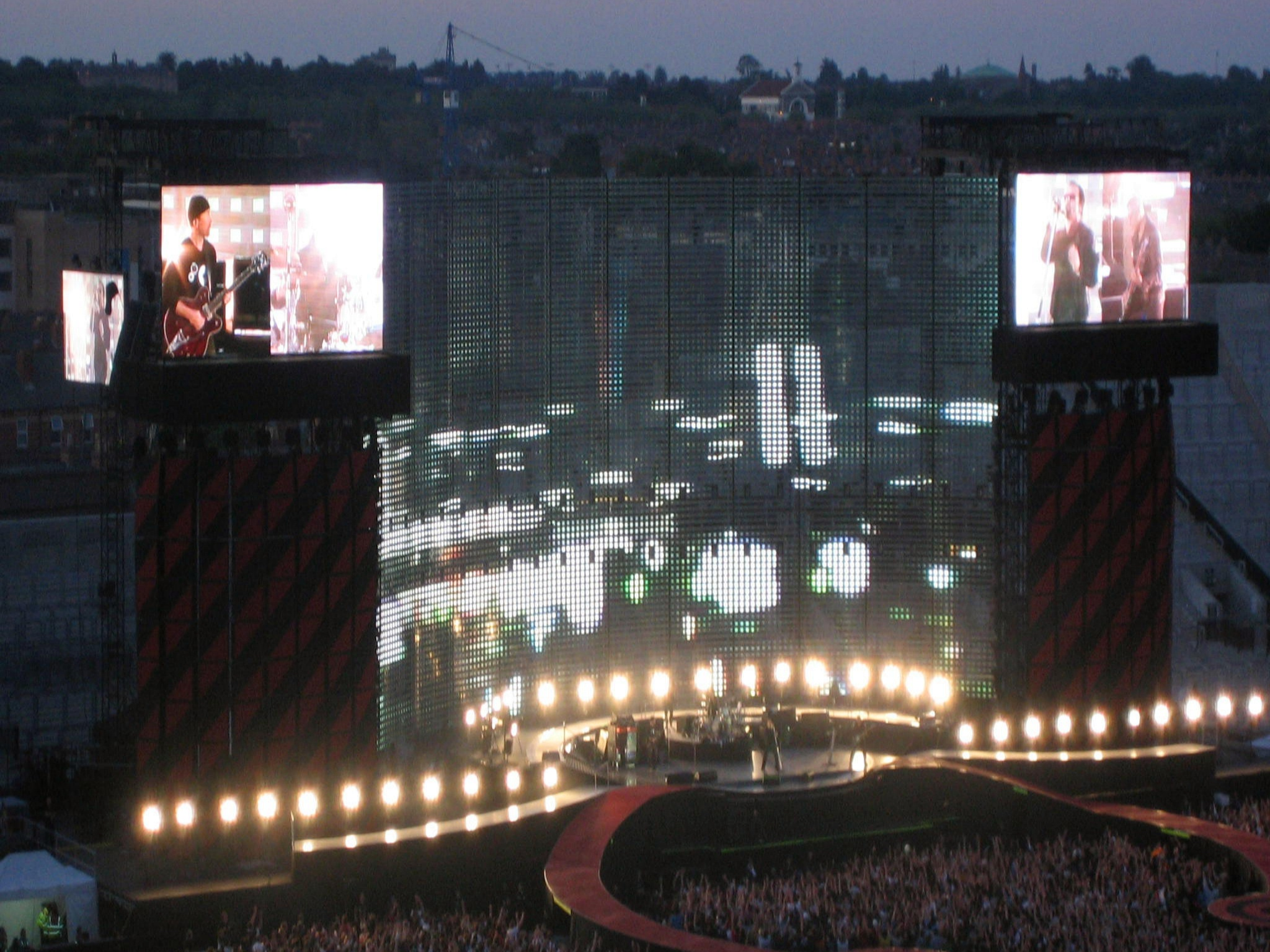
U2's Vertigo Tour at Croke Park in 2005

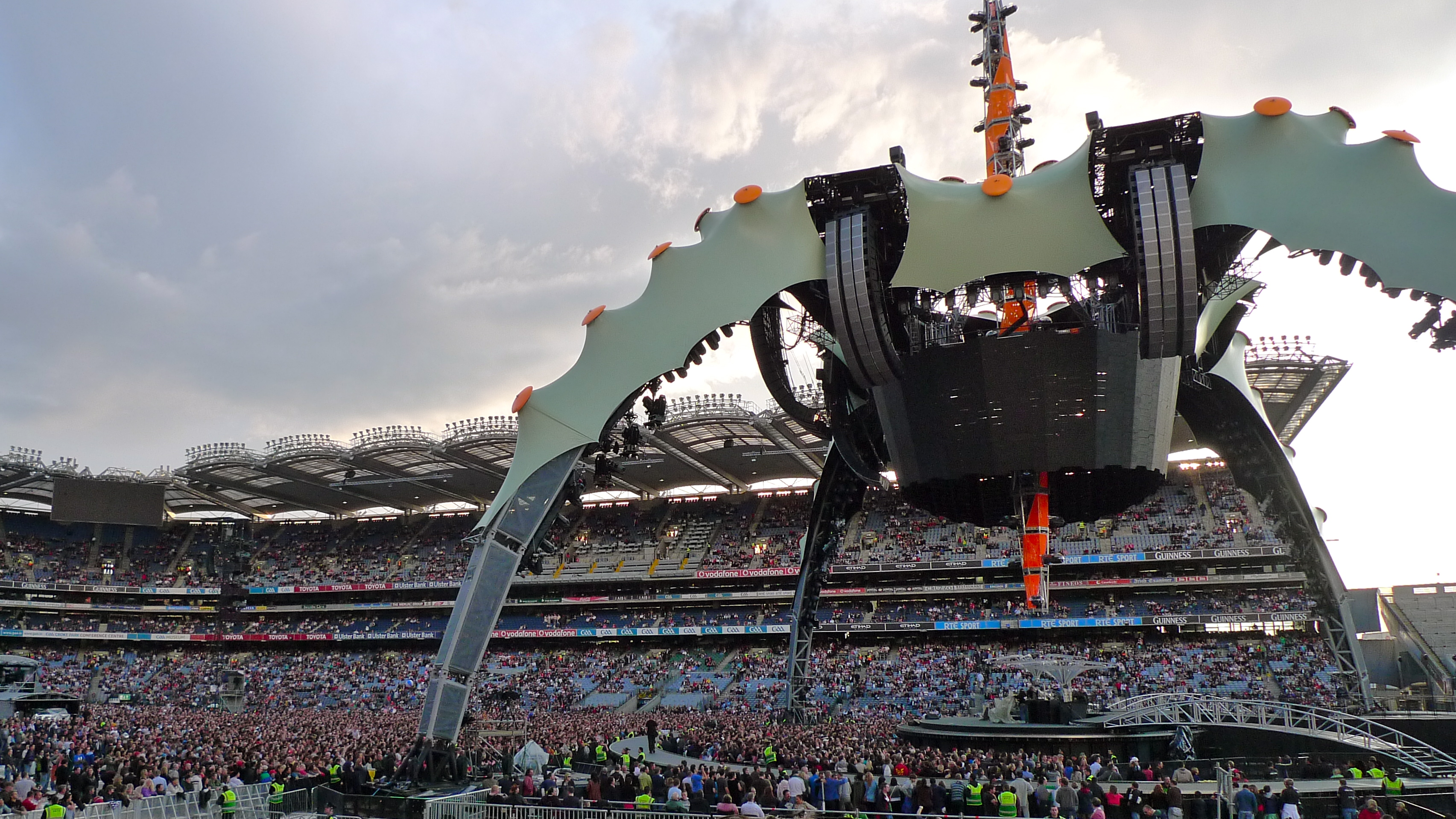
U2's 360° Tour at Croke Park in 2009

Date	Performer(s)	Opening act(s)	Tour/Event	Attendance	Revenue	Notes
29 June 1985	U2	In Tua Nua, R.E.M., The Alarm, Squeeze	The Unforgettable Fire Tour	57,000		First Irish act to have a headline concert. Part of the concert was filmed for the group's documentary Wide Awake in Dublin.
28 June 1986	Simple Minds	Lloyd Cole and the Commotions, The Waterboys, In Tua Nua, Blue in Heaven	Once Upon A Time Tour			Guest appearance by Bono
27 June 1987	U2	Light A Big Fire, The Dubliners, The Pogues, Lou Reed	The Joshua Tree Tour	114,000		
28 June 1987	U2	Christy Moore, The Pretenders, Lou Reed, Hothouse Flowers	The Joshua Tree Tour	114,000		
28 June 1996	Tina Turner	Brian Kennedy	Wildest Dreams Tour	40,000	$1,510,000	
16 May 1997	Garth Brooks	—N/a	The Garth Brooks World Tour (1996–1998)			Also featured Susan Ashton and Trisha Yearwood.
17 May 1997	Garth Brooks	—N/a	The Garth Brooks World Tour (1996–1998)			Also featured Susan Ashton and Trisha Yearwood.
18 May 1997	Garth Brooks	—N/a	The Garth Brooks World Tour (1996–1998)			Also featured Susan Ashton and Trisha Yearwood.
29 May 1998	Elton John & Billy Joel	—N/a	Face to Face 1998			
30 May 1998	Elton John & Billy Joel	—N/a	Face to Face 1998			
24 June 2005	U2	The Radiators from Space, The Thrills, The Bravery, Snow Patrol, Paddy Casey, Ash	Vertigo Tour	246,743	$21,163,695	
25 June 2005	U2	The Radiators from Space, The Thrills, The Bravery, Snow Patrol, Paddy Casey, Ash	Vertigo Tour	246,743	$21,163,695	
27 June 2005	U2	The Radiators from Space, The Thrills, The Bravery, Snow Patrol, Paddy Casey, Ash	Vertigo Tour	246,743	$21,163,695	
20 May 2006	Bon Jovi	Nickelback	Have a Nice Day Tour	81,327	$6,414,434	
9 June 2006	Robbie Williams	Basement Jaxx	Close Encounters Tour			
6 October 2007	The Police	Fiction Plane	The Police Reunion Tour	81,640	$11,837,425	Largest attendance of the tour. Guest appearance by Bono.
31 May 2008	Celine Dion	Il Divo	Taking Chances World Tour	61,746	$8,650,493	
1 June 2008	Westlife	Shayne Ward	Back Home Tour	82,300		Second Irish act to have a headline concert. Largest attendance of the tour. Part of the concert was filmed for the group's documentary and concert DVD 10 Years of Westlife - Live at Croke Park Stadium.
14 June 2008	Neil Diamond					
13 June 2009	Take That	The Script	Take That Present: The Circus Live			
24 July 2009	U2	Glasvegas, Damien Dempsey	U2 360° Tour	243,198	$28,815,352	
25 July 2009	U2	Kaiser Chiefs, Republic of Loose	U2 360° Tour	243,198	$28,815,352	
27 July 2009	U2	Bell X1, The Script	U2 360° Tour	243,198	$28,815,352	The performances of "New Year's Day" and "I'll Go Crazy If I Don't Go Crazy Tonight" were recorded for the group's live album U22 and for the band's remix album Artificial Horizon and the live EP Wide Awake in Europe, respectively.
5 June 2010	Westlife	Wonderland, WOW, JLS, Jedward	Where We Are Tour	86,500	$5,914,820	Largest attendance of the tour.
18 June 2011	Take That	Pet Shop Boys	Progress Live	154,828	$18,217,500	
19 June 2011	Take That	Pet Shop Boys	Progress Live	154,828	$18,217,500	
22 June 2012	Westlife	Jedward, The Wanted, Lawson	Greatest Hits Tour	187,808		The 23 June 2012 date broke the stadium record for selling out its tickets in four minutes. Eleventh largest attendance at an outdoor stadium worldwide. Largest attendance of the tour and Westlife's history. Part of the concert was filmed for the group's documentary and concert DVD The Farewell Tour - Live in Croke Park.
23 June 2012	Westlife	Jedward, The Wanted, Lawson	Greatest Hits Tour	187,808		The 23 June 2012 date broke the stadium record for selling out its tickets in four minutes. Eleventh largest attendance at an outdoor stadium worldwide. Largest attendance of the tour and Westlife's history. Part of the concert was filmed for the group's documentary and concert DVD The Farewell Tour - Live in Croke Park.
26 June 2012	Red Hot Chili Peppers	Noel Gallagher's High Flying Birds, The Vaccines	I'm with You World Tour			
23 May 2014	One Direction	5 Seconds of Summer	Where We Are Tour	235,008	$20,115,900	
24 May 2014	One Direction	5 Seconds of Summer	Where We Are Tour	235,008	$20,115,900	
25 May 2014	One Direction	5 Seconds of Summer	Where We Are Tour	235,008	$20,115,900	
20 June 2015	The Script	Pharrell Williams, The Wailers	No Sound Without Silence Tour	74,635		
24 July 2015	Ed Sheeran		x Tour	162,308	$11,713,029	
25 July 2015	Ed Sheeran		x Tour	162,308	$11,713,029	
27 May 2016	Bruce Springsteen		The River Tour 2016	160,188	$19,228,100	
29 May 2016	Bruce Springsteen		The River Tour 2016	160,188	$19,228,100	
9 July 2016	Beyoncé	Chloe x Halle, Ingrid Burley	The Formation World Tour	68,575	$7,449,942	Highest attendance for a female act on a single night.
8 July 2017	Coldplay	AlunaGeorge, Tove Lo	A Head Full of Dreams Tour	80,398	$8,970,100	
22 July 2017	U2	Noel Gallagher's High Flying Birds	The Joshua Tree Tour 2017	80,901	$9,963,957	
17 May 2018	The Rolling Stones	The Academic	No Filter Tour	64,823	$8,771,102	
15 June 2018	Taylor Swift	Camila Cabello; Charli XCX	Taylor Swift's Reputation Stadium Tour	133,034	$8,567,769	First woman to headline two shows on a single tour.
16 June 2018	Taylor Swift	Camila Cabello; Charli XCX	Taylor Swift's Reputation Stadium Tour	133,034	$8,567,769	First woman to headline two shows on a single tour.
7 July 2018	Michael Bublé	Emeli Sandé				
24 May 2019	Spice Girls	Jess Glynne	Spice World - 2019 UK Tour	74,186	$8,070,740	
5 July 2019	Westlife	James Arthur; Wild Youth	The Twenty Tour	148,470	$11,577,344	The 5 July date sold out in six minutes. The 6 July date was sold out in under forty-eight hours, and recorded for a concert film.
6 July 2019	Westlife	James Arthur; Wild Youth	The Twenty Tour	148,470	$11,577,344	The 5 July date sold out in six minutes. The 6 July date was sold out in under forty-eight hours, and recorded for a concert film.
23 April 2022	Ed Sheeran	Maisie Peters; Denise Chaila	+–=÷x Tour	140,487 / 151,054	$12,765,829	
24 April 2022	Ed Sheeran	Maisie Peters; Denise Chaila	+–=÷x Tour	140,487 / 151,054	$12,765,829	
9 September 2022	Garth Brooks		The Garth Brooks Stadium Tour	401,000	$28,621,080	Replaced the five 2014 shows that were cancelled due to a disagreement between management and local residents who did not want five concerts to occur.
10 September 2022	Garth Brooks		The Garth Brooks Stadium Tour	401,000	$28,621,080	Replaced the five 2014 shows that were cancelled due to a disagreement between management and local residents who did not want five concerts to occur.
11 September 2022	Garth Brooks		The Garth Brooks Stadium Tour	401,000	$28,621,080	Replaced the five 2014 shows that were cancelled due to a disagreement between management and local residents who did not want five concerts to occur.
16 September 2022	Garth Brooks		The Garth Brooks Stadium Tour	401,000	$28,621,080	Replaced the five 2014 shows that were cancelled due to a disagreement between management and local residents who did not want five concerts to occur.
17 September 2022	Garth Brooks		The Garth Brooks Stadium Tour	401,000	$28,621,080	Replaced the five 2014 shows that were cancelled due to a disagreement between management and local residents who did not want five concerts to occur.
19 May 2024	Bruce Springsteen and The E Street Band		2024 World Tour			
17 August 2024	AC/DC	The Pretty Reckless	Power Up Tour			
29 August 2024	Coldplay	Maggie Rogers; Aby Coulibaly	Music of the Spheres World Tour	329,200 / 329,200	$49,520,804	First group to perform four shows on a single tour
30 August 2024	Coldplay	Maggie Rogers; Aby Coulibaly	Music of the Spheres World Tour	329,200 / 329,200	$49,520,804	First group to perform four shows on a single tour
1 September 2024	Coldplay	Maggie Rogers; Aby Coulibaly	Music of the Spheres World Tour	329,200 / 329,200	$49,520,804	First group to perform four shows on a single tour
2 September 2024	Coldplay	Maggie Rogers; Aby Coulibaly	Music of the Spheres World Tour	329,200 / 329,200	$49,520,804	First group to perform four shows on a single tour
16-17 August 2025	Oasis	Cast, Richard Ashcroft	Oasis Live '25 Tour			
23 August 2025	Robbie Williams	The Lottery Winners	Britpop Tour			
22-23 August 2026	The Weeknd	Playboi Carti	After Hours til Dawn Tour			
30 August 2026	Bon Jovi		Forever Tour			

Harry Styles Sabrina Carpetner Foo Fighters

== Non-Gaelic games ==
There was great debate in Ireland regarding the use of Croke Park for sports other than those of the GAA. As the GAA was founded as a nationalist organisation to maintain and promote indigenous Irish sport, it has felt honour-bound throughout its history to oppose other, foreign (in practice, British) sports. In turn, nationalist groups supported the GAA as the prime example of purely Irish sporting culture.

Until its abolition in 1971, rule 27 of the GAA constitution stated that a member of the GAA could be banned from playing its games if found to be also playing association football, rugby or cricket. That rule was abolished but rule 42 still prohibited the use of GAA property for games with interests in conflict with the interests of the GAA. The belief was that rugby and association football were in competition with Gaelic football and hurling, and that if the GAA allowed these sports to use their ground it might be harmful to Gaelic games, while other sports, not seen as direct competitors with Gaelic football and hurling, were permitted, such as the two games of American football, the Croke Park Classic college football game between the University of Central Florida and Penn State and an American Bowl NFL preseason game between the Chicago Bears and the Pittsburgh Steelers, on the Croke Park pitch during the 1990s.

In June 2003, Croke Park served as the main venue for the 2003 Special Olympics World Summer Games with a noted highlight of the Special Olympics being Muhammad Ali attending the opening ceremony. They were the first edition of the Special Olympics World Summer Games not to be held in the United States.

On 16 April 2005, a motion to temporarily relax rule No. 42 was passed at the GAA Annual Congress. The motion gives the GAA Central Council the power to authorise the renting or leasing of Croke Park for events other than those controlled by the Association, during a period when Lansdowne Road – the venue for international football and rugby matches – was closed for redevelopment. The final result was 227 in favour of the motion to 97 against, 11 votes more than the required two-thirds majority.

In January 2006, it was announced that the GAA had reached an agreement with the Football Association of Ireland (FAI) and Irish Rugby Football Union (IRFU) to stage two Six Nations games and four football internationals at Croke Park in 2007 and in February 2007, use of the pitch by the FAI and the IRFU in 2008 was also agreed. These agreements were within the temporary relaxation terms, as Lansdowne Road was still under redevelopment until 2010. Although the GAA had said that hosted use of Croke Park would not extend beyond 2008, irrespective of the redevelopment progress, fixtures for the 2009 Six Nations rugby tournament saw the Irish rugby team using Croke park for a third season. 11 February 2007 saw the first rugby union international to be played there. Ireland were leading France in a Six Nations clash, but lost 17–20 after conceding a last minute (converted) try. Raphaël Ibañez scored the first try in that match; Ronan O'Gara scored Ireland's first-ever try at Croke Park.

A second match between Ireland and England on 24 February 2007 was politically symbolic because of the events of Bloody Sunday in 1920. There was considerable concern as to what reaction there would be to the singing of the British national anthem "God Save the Queen". Ultimately the anthem was sung without interruption or incident, and applauded by both sets of supporters at the match, which Ireland won by 43–13 (their largest-ever win over England in rugby).

On 2 March 2010, Ireland played their final international rugby match against a Scotland team that was playing to avoid the wooden spoon and hadn't won a championship match against Ireland since 2001. Outside half, Dan Parks inspired the Scots to a 3-point victory and ended Irish Hopes of a triple crown.

On 24 March 2007, the first association football match took place at Croke Park. The Republic of Ireland took on Wales in UEFA Euro 2008 qualifying Group D, with a Stephen Ireland goal securing a 1–0 victory for the Irish in front of a crowd of 72,500. Prior to this, the IFA Cup had been played at the then Jones' Road in 1901, but this was 12 years before the GAA took ownership.

Croke Park was included as one of the stadiums in the Euro 2028 bid shortlist by England, the Republic of Ireland, Scotland, Wales and Northern Ireland, but did not make the final list.

=== NFL Ireland Game ===
Negotiations took place for the NFL International Series's 2011 game to be held at Croke Park but the game was awarded to Wembley Stadium. In July 2013, it was announced that Penn State would open their 2014 college football season against Central Florida at Croke Park. Croke Park held its first regular season NFL game 28 September 2025 with the Pittsburgh Steelers as the designated home team defeating the Minnesota Vikings 24–21 in front of 74,512 fans.

Year	Date	Designated visitor	Score	Designated home team	Score	Stadium	City	Attendance
2025	28 September	Minnesota Vikings	21	Pittsburgh Steelers	24	Croke Park	Dublin	74,512

=== World record rugby union attendance ===
On 2 May 2009, Croke Park was the venue for a Heineken Cup rugby semi-final, in which Leinster defeated Munster 25–6. The attendance of 82,208 set a new world record attendance for a club rugby union game. This record stood until 31 March 2012 when it was surpassed by an English Premiership game between Harlequins and Saracens at Wembley Stadium which hosted a crowd of 83,761. This was beaten again in 2016 in the Top 14 final at the Nou Camp which hosted a crowd of 99,124.

=== Katie Taylor's final fight ===
When Irish boxing icon Katie Taylor announced she would retire in 2026, her longtime promoter of Matchroom Boxing decided to stage the event at Croke Park, a venue where she had always wanted to compete. More than 80,000 tickets were sold for her farewell card in the first 17 minutes after going on sale, and the attendance on 5 September was reported to be at least 83,000. In the main event, Taylor defeated previously unbeaten Flora Pili by unanimous decision, retiring as the undisputed super lightweight champion. This was the first boxing event at Croke Park since July 1972, when 18,725 attended a card headlined by Muhammad Ali defeating Alvin Lewis.

== Skyline tour ==
A walkway, known under a sponsorship deal as Kellogg's Skyline Tour Croke Park, opened on 1 June 2012. From 44 metres above the ground, it offers views of Dublin city and the surrounding area. The Olympic Torch was brought to the stadium and along the walkway on 6 June 2012.

== GAA Hall of Fame ==
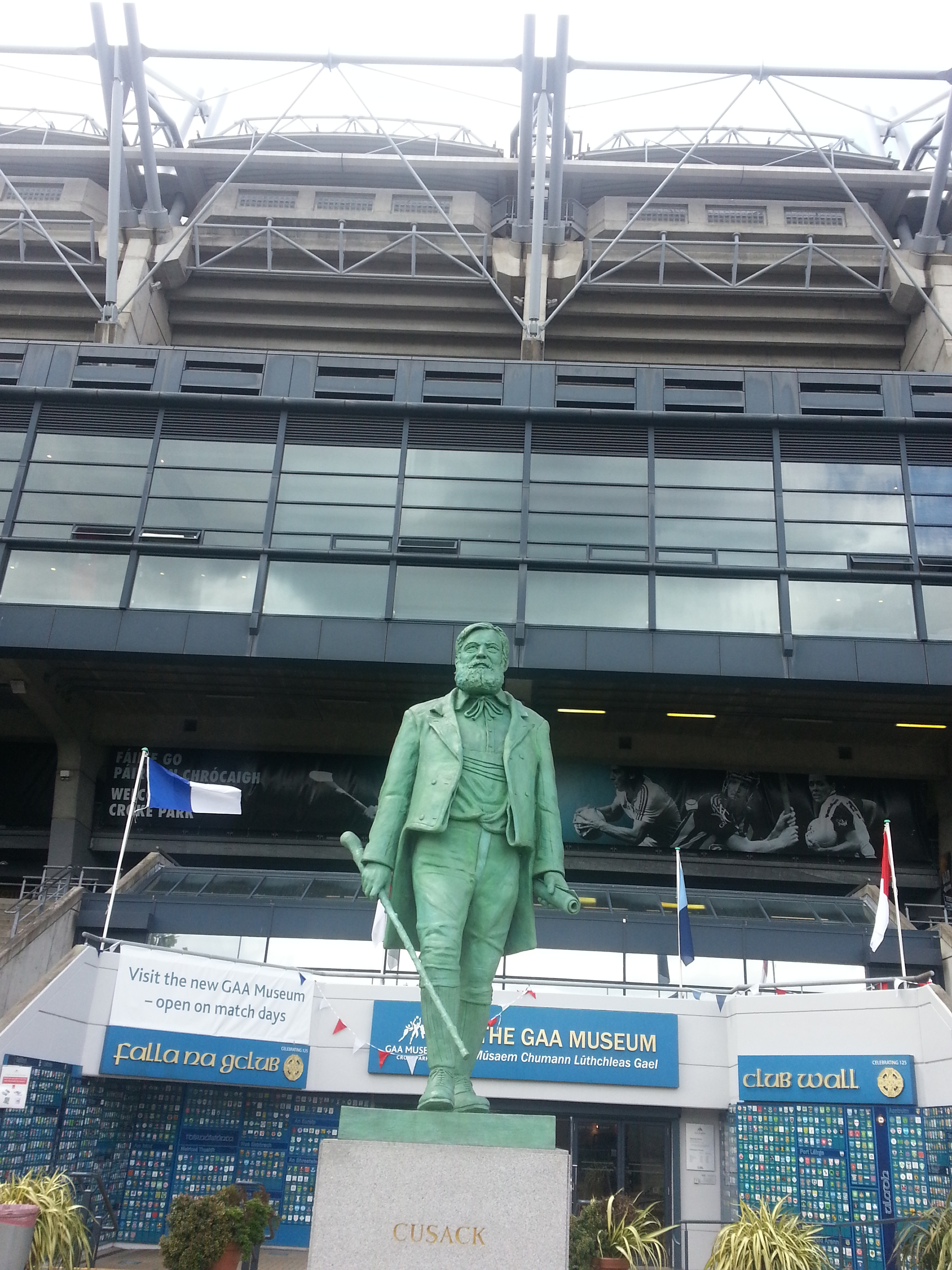
Statue of Michael Cusack outside the Croke Park GAA Museum

On 11 February 2013, the GAA opened the Hall of Fame section in the Croke Park Museum. The foundation of the award scheme is the Teams of the Millennium the football team which was announced in 1999 and the hurling team in 2000 and all 30 players were inducted into the hall of fame along with Limerick hurler Éamonn Cregan and Offaly footballer Tony McTague who were chosen by a GAA sub-committee from the years 1970–74. New inductees will be chosen on an annual basis from the succeeding five-year intervals as well as from the years preceding 1970. In April 2014, Kerry legend Mick O'Dwyer, Sligo footballer Micheál Kerins, along with hurlers Noel Skehan of Kilkenny and Pat McGrath of Waterford became the second group of former players to receive Hall of Fame awards.

== National Handball Centre ==
The new National Handball Centre, located at the southeast corner of the stadium on Sackville Avenue, is close to completion, with the final minor stages of building delayed slightly due to the COVID-19 coronavirus pandemic. The new centre contains three 4-Wall handball courts – including a three-sided glass wall show court with amphitheatre style seating for a capacity of 500 spectators, a Softball show court with seating capacity for 200 spectators and three 1-Wall courts as well as offices for GAA Handball staff, a bar and cafe as well as a community centre. The centre was used by Ireland's national health service, the Health Service Executive for COVID-19 testing during the COVID-19 pandemic.

While the centre's official opening was delayed due to both the COVID-19 pandemic as well as the final completion of remaining building works, the centre had a 'soft' opening in December 2021, allowing registered players to book the courts through Croke Park. The first competitive One-wall handball match took place in the centre in December 2022 during the European 1-Wall Tour "EliteStop" held in the Centre on Saturday and Sunday, 10–11 December 2022. The first competitive Four-wall handball matches to be played in the new Centre took place on Sunday, 2 April 2023 from 10 am with the GAA Handball O'Neills-sponsored All-Ireland 4-Wall Senior Doubles semi-finals taking place in both Men's and Ladies codes.

== See also ==
- Hill 16
- List of Gaelic Athletic Association stadiums
- List of stadiums in Ireland by capacity
- Sport in Ireland
  - Camogie
  - Gaelic football
  - Hurling
  - Gaelic handball
  - International rules football
- Garth Brooks concerts controversy 2014
- Lists of stadiums
