= One-wall handball =

Ball sport where one hits a ball off a wall with their hand against an opponent

Wallball / One-wall handball / International fronton
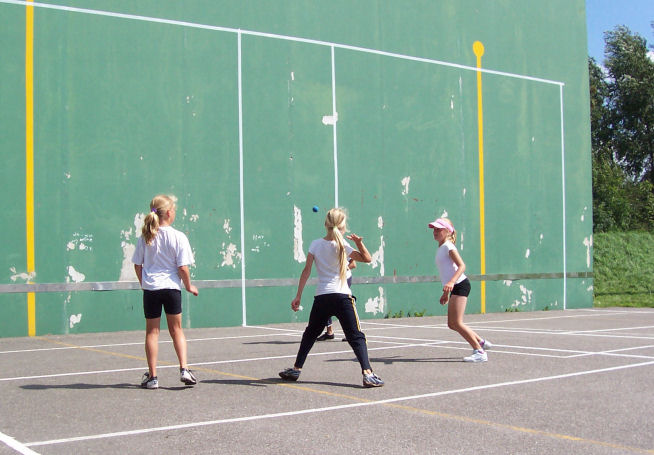
- Girls playing 1-walled fronton
- Highest governing body: World Wallball Association (WWBA) [Jointly setup by the World Handball Council, the CIJB and GAA Handball]

Characteristics
- Contact: Non-contact
- Team members: Singles or doubles
- Mixed-sex: No, separate competitions
- Type: Outdoor or indoor
- Equipment: Small, rubber ball (Big ball) or smaller, harder rubber ball (Small ball)
- Venue: One-wall handball / wallball court (also known as handball alley or simply "court")

Presence
- Country or region: Worldwide

One-wall handball, also known as 1-wall, wallball or international fronton, is a wall game (indirect style) where the player hits a small rubber ball with their hand against a wall. The goal of the game is to score more points than the opponent. The player then hits the ball, and the ball bounces off the wall and the floor within court lines, if the opponent fails to return the ball, the player scores a point. The sport was created to bring together varieties, such as American handball, Basque pelota, Patball, Gaelic handball, Pêl-Law (Welsh handball) and Valencian frontó.

== Courtfield ==
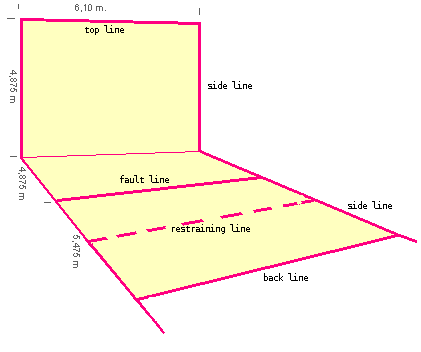
International Fronton courtfield

International fronton uses the most basic courtfield layout of the indirect style: one wall where the ball must bounce.

This only wall, the fronton, is 6.1 metres (20 ft) wide and 4.9 metres (16 ft) high. From the left and right corners two lines are drawn on the ground, 1.6 metres (5 ft 3 in) long, that mark the place into which the ball may bounce, this is the courtfield.

There must be some free space out the courtfield 1.8 metres (5 ft 11 in) for the players to play balls that are risking to bounce twice.

At 4.9 metres (16 ft) from the fronton wall there is a line on the ground, the fault line. The serving player must throw the ball before that line, and the ball must surpass it after bouncing on the fronton.

At 10.6 metres (35 ft) from the fronton there is another line on the ground, the back line, which the ball may not bounce from.

In agreement with American handball (and unlike Basque pelota and Valencian frontó) there is no left or back wall, the ball may bounce on the lines, and, specially, there is no line on the fronton for the ball to ball over.

== Ball ==
The One Wall ball / International fronton ball ('big ball') is a synthetic one, without any default colour. According to the GAA Handball 1-Wall playing rules (as of January 2019, which is in line with United States Handball Association playing rules), the ball used shall be in line with the following:

1. The material should be rubber or synthetic material.
2. Colour is optional.
3. Size is 1 and 7/8-inch diameter, with a variation of 1/32-inch, +/-.
4. The ball shall be 61 grams, with a variation of 3 grams, +/-y
5. Rebound from free fall, 70-inch drop to a hardwood floor is 48 to 52 inches at a temperature of 68 degrees F.

This ball is also used in the 'Big Ball' grades at the World Handball Championships organised by the World Handball Council. The one-wall ball is widely available - manufacturers of the one-all ball include O'Neills, Decathlon 'Urball' brand, MacSports 'Challenger' brand & Sky Bounce. The 'small ball' (mainly used in 4-Wall American handball/Gaelic handball competitions) is also used in the 'small ball' one-wall/wallball grades at the World Championships.

== Rules ==
Two players (1 against 1) or four players (2 against 2) play to score points until one of them attain two sets (composed by 21 points).

In case of a tie, 1–1 sets, a third set is played, where the first service is done by the winner of the previous set.

Players strike the ball with the hand so that it bounces on the fronton and falls into the courtfield. Whoever fails to do so commits a fault and so loses a point, then the opponent serves.

A fault is committed if:

- The player hits the ball with any other part of the body but the hand.
- The ball does not bounce on the fronton.
- The ball's first bounce on the ground is out the courtfield.
- The player strikes the ball after a second bounce on the ground.

== Competitions ==
One-wall handball, also known as wallball, is played in national and international competitions. These include national championships organised by handball federations and international championships involving players from different countries. In Ireland, GAA Handball organises wallball competitions as part of its programme of Irish handball, while the World Wallball Championships provide international competition in the one-wall code.

=== GAA Handball competitions ===
GAA Handball, the governing body for handball within the Gaelic Athletic Association (GAA), organises competitions across four codes: 4-wall, wallball, softball and hardball. Its competition programme includes juvenile, adult and overage categories.

The Irish Wallball Nationals are an annual competition featuring men's and women's open events, alongside juvenile and other graded competitions. The 2026 Irish Wallball Nationals were held in County Galway, with matches taking place across several venues and competitors participating in open and age-grade categories.

GAA Handball also organises school and juvenile wallball activities and collaborates with external organisations on competitions and development programmes.

=== Britain GAA ===
Britain GAA (Provincial Council of Britain) is the Provincial Council of the Gaelic Athletic Association in Britain, comprising seven county boards: Gloucestershire, Hertfordshire, Lancashire, London, Scotland, Warwickshire and Yorkshire. The council administers Gaelic games in Britain, including Gaelic football and hurling.

Gaelic handball is also played in Britain, with players and clubs participating in the wider GAA Handball competition structure and international wallball events. Further information on the organisation of Gaelic games in Britain is available on the Britain GAA website.

=== World Wallball Championships ===
The World Wallball Championships are international competitions in the one-wall code of handball, involving players representing different countries. The championships include men's and women's events and junior and graded competitions.

The 2024 World Wallball Championships were held at the University of Limerick, Ireland, from 18 to 23 August. The event was hosted by GAA Handball and attracted participants from Ireland and other countries.

The 2026 World Wallball Championships were held in New York City, United States, in September. The competition included international participation across senior and juvenile categories, with Ireland represented by a national team selected through GAA Handball.

=== Other national competitions ===
One-wall handball is also played in national championships and tournaments organised by national handball federations and associations. In the United States, the United States Handball Association (USHA) organises national handball competitions, including one-wall events. National and regional tournaments are also organised by handball associations in other countries.

== See also ==
- GAA Handball
- United States Handball Association
- Britain GAA
