= Irish Collegiate Handball Association =

Irish sports governing body

The Irish Collegiate Handball Association (ICHA) is the national governing body for third-level handball in Ireland. It is composed of students and former students. Twenty-one handball clubs are affiliated at present. The ICHA organises 3 intervarsity handball championships each year in 60x30, 40x20 Team and 40x20 Singles, with events held at various locations throughout the year.

== United States Collegiate National Handball Championship ==
Each year, the ICHA organises a trip to the United States Collegiate National Handball Championships. This tournament generally takes place in the third week in February, and are organised by the USHA (United States Handball Association). As a registered student in an Irish college, in order to be eligible for this tournament you must also be a registered member of the ICHA. The maximum number of years a player can attend this competition is four.

== Previous competitors ==
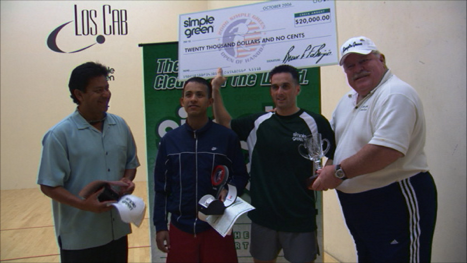
Paul Brady wins the 2006 Simple Green U.S. .Open of Handball. Right to left: Naty Alvarado Sr., Naty Alvarado Jr., Paul Brady, tournament director Bruce FaBrizio

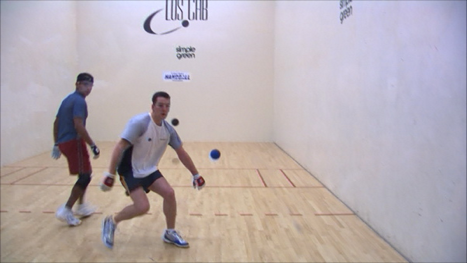
Tony Healy attempts a backwall shot in the semi-finals of the 2006 Simple Green U.S. Open of Handball

On October 19–22, 2006, World Pro Handball produced a live webcast of the Simple Green U.S. Open of Handball, in which former Irish Collegiate player Paul Brady defeated Naty Alvarado Jr. in a tiebreaker to win US$20,000 in prize money.

Other former Collegiate players, such as Tony Healy and Eoin Kennedy, have been successful playing on the US Pro-Stop tour.
