= Wide Awake in Europe =

2010 EP by U2

EP (Live) by U2
- Released: 26 November 2010
- Recorded: July 2009, September 2010
- Genre: Rock
- Length: 18:32
- Label: Interscope
- Producer: Declan Gaffney

U2 chronology
U2360° at the Rose Bowl (2010)	Wide Awake in Europe (2010)	Duals (2011)

Wide Awake in Europe is a live EP by rock band U2. The release was created by the organizers of Record Store Day to bring customers into independent record shops for holiday shopping. A limited number of 5,000 EPs were produced, and were released on Black Friday in 2010, mostly to record shops in North America. The EP features three live tracks on a 12-inch vinyl record, taken from three different concerts during the U2 360° Tour in 2009 and 2010. The EP comprises the songs "I'll Go Crazy If I Don't Go Crazy Tonight", "Moment of Surrender", and "Mercy", the latter a previously unreleased track that was debuted on tour.

== Background and release ==
The potential release of an EP was first announced by U2 bassist Adam Clayton in an August 2010 U2.com video, after stating that the band was not yet ready to release another album. In mid-October, listings for the EP appeared on Amazon, with a release date of 22 November. Details of the release were officially announced on 26 October with the track listing and release date information, along with details about its exclusive release to independent record stores, despite its listing on Amazon. U2.com officially announced the release on 16 November, and "Moment of Surrender" from the release was streamed on the website exclusively for the site's subscribers, beginning the following the day. On the day of the EP's release, U2.com streamed all three tracks for the site's subscribers for a 48-hour period.

"We all wanted to get behind Record Store Day. My local record shop introduced me to music I didn’t know and I might never have discovered."

— Adam Clayton

The EP originated with the creators of Record Store Day as an exclusive release as part of the "Back to Black Friday" program along with over 30 releases from other artists. The program's objective was to draw customers to independent record shops on Black Friday and throughout the 2010 holiday shopping season, as opposed to big-box stores and shopping malls. The EP was released by Interscope Records on 26 November 2010, exclusively for independent record shops in the North America, with a select number of copies available in Europe. U2.com stated copies would be available in the United Kingdom and Ireland.

The release was limited to 5,000 copies, all of which were individually numbered, although some pressings had higher numbers, as jackets damaged during the manufacturing process were destroyed and reprinted with newer numbers. An owner of a Milwaukee, Wisconsin store compared ordering the EP to roulette, saying he "ordered 15 [copies] hoping to get 6". Twenty of the copies were given away in a December 2010 sweepstakes for U2.com site subscribers.

Pre-orders for the EP were available from online retailer The Ideal Copy, but had sold out by the end of October, almost a month prior to the release. New Jersey–based retailer Vintage Vinyl Records described the EP as an "Indie-Exclusive Black Friday item", and also sold pre-orders online, but had ended pre-orders early to ensure copies were available for Black Friday. On the day of its release, several record shops in the US reported Wide Awake in Europe as one of their best-sellers. The EP was sold for around US$10–20, but copies were selling on eBay the following day for $75.

== Content ==
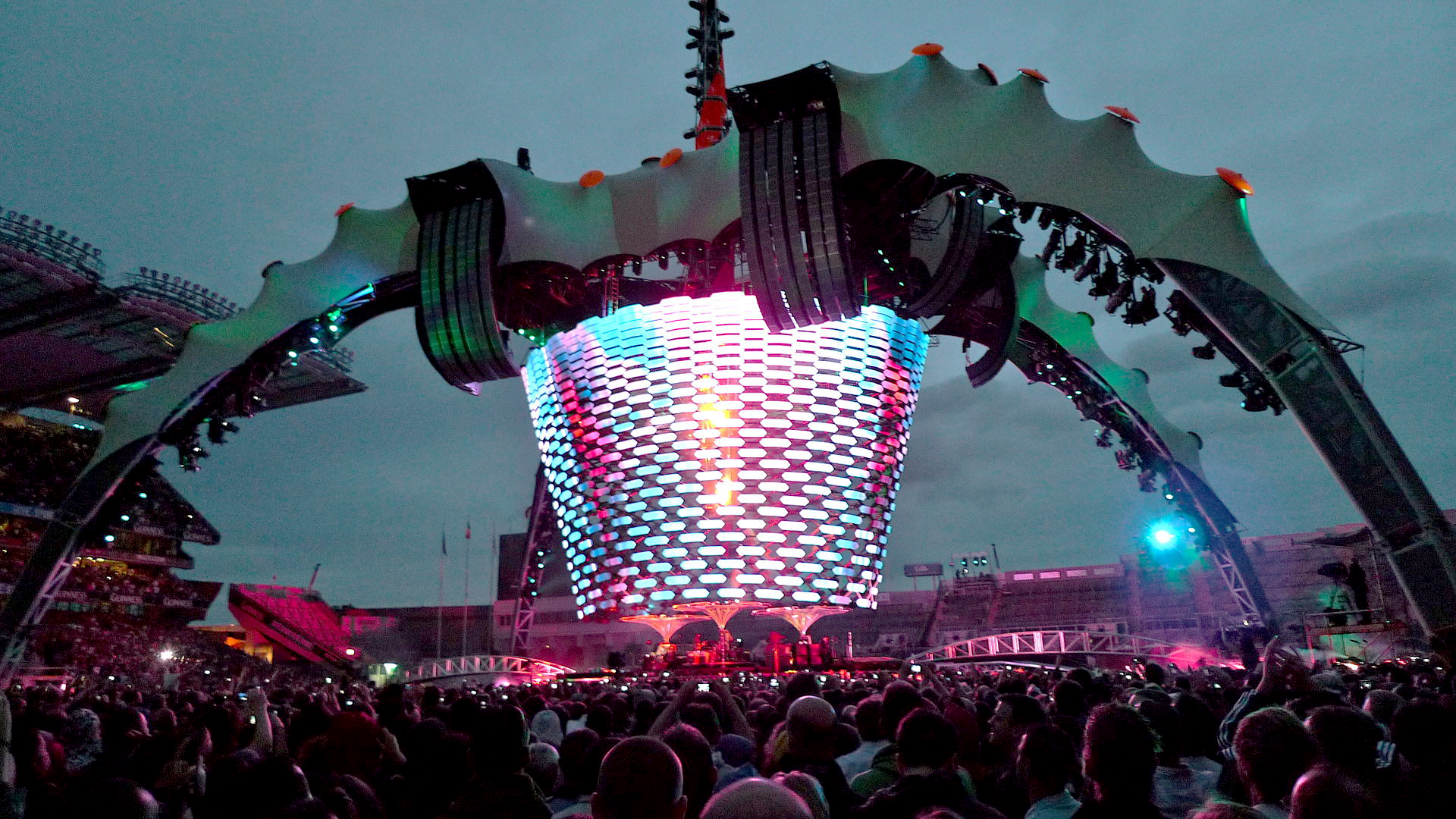
The three live tracks on the EP were recorded during the U2 360° Tour in 2009 and 2010.

The title and cover of the EP are references to U2's 1985 EP Wide Awake in America. All the tracks were recorded by Alastair McMillan, and mixed by the EP's producer, Declan Gaffney.

Side A of the record features "Mercy", which was debuted during the U2 360° Tour in September 2010. Previously, "Mercy" had leaked online as a track from the sessions for U2's 2004 album How to Dismantle an Atomic Bomb, but Wide Awake in Europe was the first official release of the song. The performance included on the EP is taken from band's concert in Brussels during the month of its debut, and was the fourth-ever live performance of the song.

Side B features performances of "I'll Go Crazy If I Don't Go Crazy Tonight" (from Dublin in July 2009) and "Moment of Surrender" (from Paris in September 2010), both of which are from U2's 2009 studio album, No Line on the Horizon. The EP's live version of the "I'll Go Crazy" live remix from Dublin was previously released on the 2009 U2.com member-exclusive remix album, Artificial Horizon, and was remixed by Redanka and Dirty South. The track also features a clip of "Beshno Az Ney/Windfall" by Sussan Deyhim.

In a review published by Sputnikmusic two weeks after Wide Awake in Europe's release, critic Irving Tan praised the EP, stating how "Mercy" was "the biggest treat to fans", while the "I'll Go Crazy" remix gives the EP a "party vibe", and that "Moment of Surrender" "manages to be hopeful, glorious, and resplendent all at once". Tan concluded by saying that the EP sends a message of the band's "youthful defiance" and stated that he looks forward to U2's fourth decade.

== Track listing ==
All lyrics are written by Bono; all music is composed by U2.

Side A
No.	Title	Music	Recorded at	Length
1.	"Mercy" (Live from Brussels)	U2	King Baudouin Stadium, 22 September 2010, Brussels	4:38

Side B
No.	Title	Music	Recorded at	Length
1.	"I'll Go Crazy If I Don't Go Crazy Tonight" (Live U2360° Remix)	U2	Croke Park, 27 July 2009, Dublin	6:44
2.	"Moment of Surrender" (Live from Paris)	U2; Brian Eno; Danny Lanois	Stade de France, 18 September 2010, Paris	7:10

== Personnel ==
- Production – Declan Gaffney
- Recording – Alastair McMillan
- Mixing – Declan Gaffney, Russell Fawcus (assistance on "I'll Go Crazy If I Don't Go Crazy Tonight")
- Mastering – Scott Sedillo at Bernie Grundman Mastering
- Audio post production – Cheryl Engles at Partial Productions
- Photography – Aaron Harris
- Sleeve design – Shaughn McGrath at Amp Visual
