= Stade Charles-Ehrmann =

Multi-use stadium in Nice, France

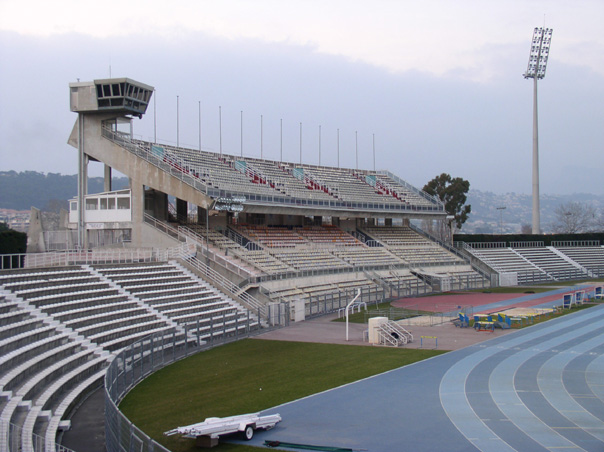
- Interactive map of Stade Charles-Ehrmann
- Former names: Stade de l'Ouest (1973–1984)
- Location: 155, route de Grenoble; 06200 Nice
- Coordinates: 43°40′42″N 7°11′52″E
- Capacity: 8,000/ 50,000
- Public transit: Nice Tramway line 2 at CADAM stop

Construction
- Opened: 2001

Tenant
- OGC Nice

Stade Charles-Ehrmann is a multi-use stadium in Nice, France. For sporting events it seats 8,000 spectators. It is sometimes used by the OGC Nice, for practice or friendly matches, and by their reserves team the Eaglets. For large concerts, it is used in conjunction with the indoor concert hall Palais Nikaïa, whose doors are opened and permit large crowds of up to 50,000 to view the stage inside the hall.

== Notable events ==
American pop singer Madonna has performed at the stadium four times: during her Who's That Girl Tour in 1987, her Blond Ambition Tour in 1990 (which was aired on HBO and released exclusively on LaserDisc titled "Blond Ambition World Tour Live"), her Sticky & Sweet Tour in 2008 and her MDNA Tour in 2012.

Rock band U2 performed at the stadium when the first one was on August 5, 2005, during their Vertigo Tour, in front of a sold-out crowd of 51,900 people. The second one was on July 15, 2009, during their U2 360° Tour, in front of a sold-out crowd of 55,641 people. The performance of "City of Blinding Lights" from the 2009 show was recorded for the group's live album U22.

Australian rock band AC/DC played at the stadium during their Black Ice World Tour with 40,000 people on June 15 2010. Another rock band performed at the stadium was Muse for their The 2nd Law World Tour on June 26 2013.

Pop superstar Michael Jackson performed at the stadium twice : during his Bad World Tour on August 14, 1988, in front of 35,000 people and during his HIStory World Tour on July 27, 1997, in front of 38,000 people.

Coldplay performed a sold-out concert at the stadium as part of their Mylo Xyloto Tour on May 22, 2012. The band came back to the stadium for their A Head Full of Dreams Tour on May 24, 2016 for a sold out crowd of 53,566.
