= Duals =

Compilation album by U2
- Released: 11 May 2011
- Recorded: 1987−2011
- Genre: Rock
- Length: 64:11
- Producer: Various

U2 chronology
Wide Awake in Europe (2010)	Duals (2011)	U22: A 22 Track Live Collection from U2360° (2012)

Duals is a compilation album by the Irish rock band U2. It was released in April 2011 to u2.com subscribers.

== Track listing ==
No.	Title	Lyrics	Music	Artists	Length
1.	"Where the Streets Have No Name"	U2	U2	U2 and Soweto Gospel Choir	5:39
2.	"The Wanderer"	Bono	U2	U2 and Johnny Cash	4:44
3.	"Falling at Your Feet"	Bono and Danny Lanois	Bono and Danny Lanois	Bono and Danny Lanois	4:55
4.	"Miss Sarajevo"	Passengers	Passengers	Passengers and Luciano Pavarotti	5:44
5.	"Slow Dancing"	Bono and The Edge	U2	U2 and Willie Nelson	4:01
6.	"The Saints Are Coming"	Richard Jobson, Stuart Adamson	Richard Jobson, Stuart Adamson	U2 and Green Day	3:22
7.	"Sunday Bloody Sunday" (Live from Auckland)	U2, additional lyrics by Jay-Z	U2	U2 and Jay-Z	4:30
8.	"One"	Bono	U2	U2 and Mary J. Blige	4:22
9.	"When Love Comes To Town"	Bono	U2	U2 and B. B. King	4:15
10.	"Stuck in a Moment You Can't Get Out Of" (Live at the Rock & Roll Hall of Fame)	Bono and The Edge	U2	U2 and Mick Jagger	4:29
11.	"The Ballad of Ronnie Drew"	Robert Hunter, Bono, The Edge and Simon Carmody	U2, The Dubliners, Kíla	U2, The Dubliners, Kíla, A Band of Bowsies	4:51
12.	"I'm Not Your Baby"	Bono	U2	U2 and Sinéad O'Connor	5:50
13.	"Stranded (Haiti Mon Amour)" (Hybrid Mix)	Bono, The Edge, Jay-Z	Bono, The Edge, Jay-Z	Jay-Z, Bono, The Edge, Rihanna	4:22
14.	"Drunk Chicken / America"	Allen Ginsberg	U2	U2 and Allen Ginsberg	1:34
15.	"Amazing Grace"	John Newton	William Walker	U2 and Soweto Gospel Choir	1:34
Total length:					64:11

- "Where the Streets Have No Name" and "Amazing Grace" are studio mix of U2's performance at the Rose Bowl, Pasadena, 25 October 2009 and Soweto Gospel Choir's parts recorded in South Africa in sync with U2's performance.
- "The Wanderer" taken from the Zooropa album, 1993.
- "Falling at Your Feet" taken from The Million Dollar Hotel soundtrack, 2000.
- "Miss Sarajevo" taken from Passengers: Original Soundtracks 1, 1995.
- "Slow Dancing" was a B-side to "If God Will Send His Angels" single, 1997.
- "The Saints are Coming" taken from the U218 Singles compilation, 2006.
- "Sunday Bloody Sunday (Live from Auckland)" recorded at Mt. Mount Stadium on 25 November 2010.
- "One" taken from Mary J Blige The Breakthrough album, 2006.
- "When Love Comes To Town" taken from Rattle and Hum album, 1988.
- "Stuck in a Moment You Can't Get Out Of (Live at the Rock & Roll Hall of Fame)" recorded at the 25th Anniversary Rock & Roll Hall of Fame concert at Madison Square Garden, 30 October 2009.
- "The Ballad of Ronnie Drew" was released as a single in 2008.
- "I'm Not Your Baby" taken from The End of Violence soundtrack, 1997.
- "Stranded (Haiti Mon Amour) (Hybrid Mix)" was written for Hope for Haiti Now album (2010).
- "Drunk Chicken / America" taken from the remastered The Joshua Tree album, 2007.
