= Gaelic handball =

Traditional sport played primarily in Ireland

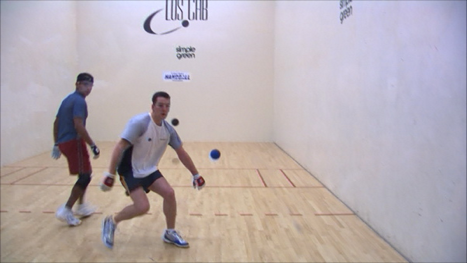
- Two men playing handball
- Highest governing body: Gaelic Athletic Association (GAA)
- Nicknames: handball, GAA handball
- First played: medieval period or earlier, Ireland
- Clubs: 180

Characteristics
- Contact: Limited
- Team members: Singles or doubles
- Mixed-sex: No; some mixed doubles played in juvenile grades
- Type: Hand and ball-striking games
- Equipment: Gaelic handball ball, goggles, non-marking gum soled shoes
- Venue: Indoor or outdoor (with glass court)

Presence
- Country or region: Ireland and Irish diaspora
- Olympic: No
- Paralympic: No
- World Games: One-wall handball was included as a Demonstration sport at 2013 World Games, Colombia

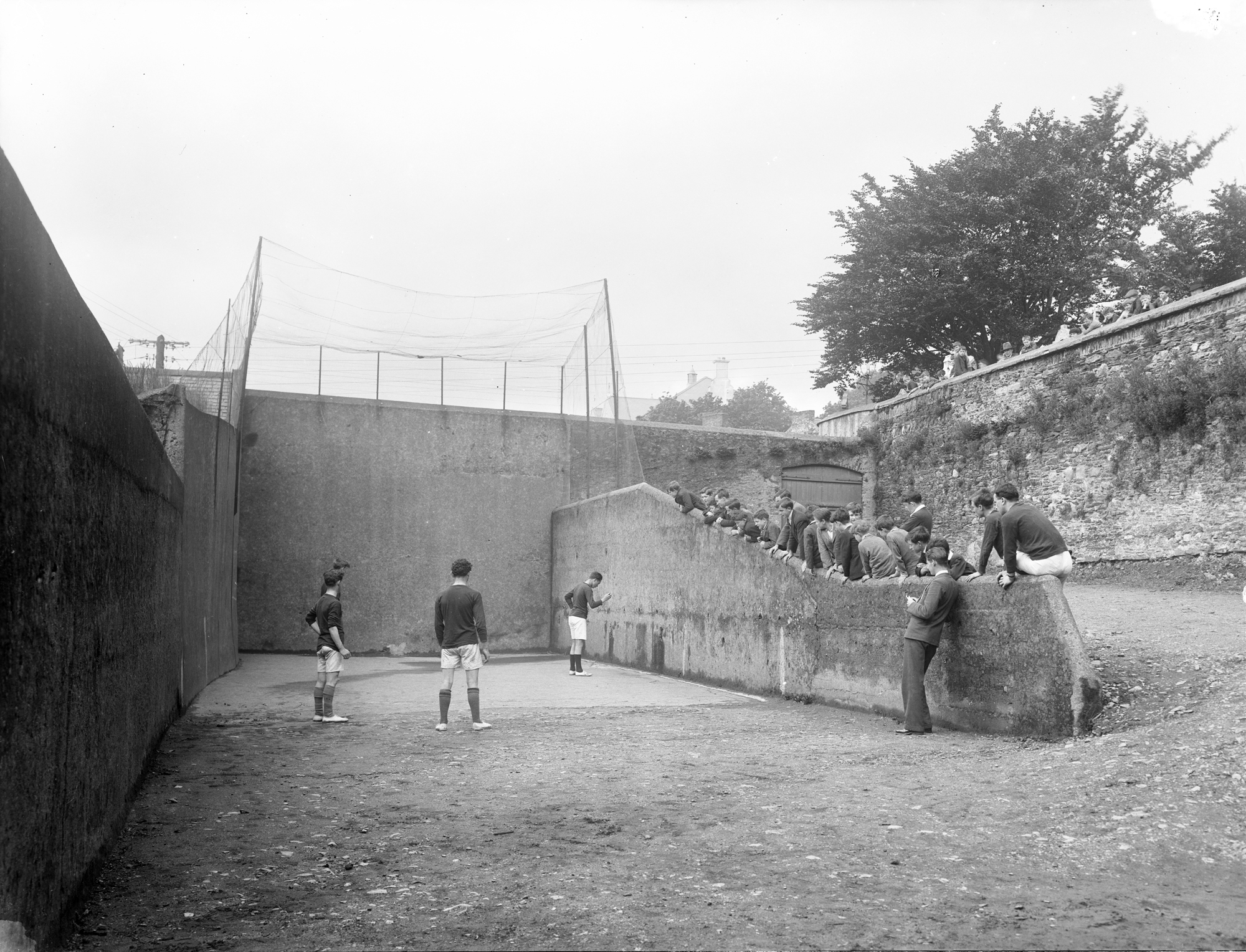
Boys playing handball at a handball court in Ireland in the 1930s

Gaelic handball (known in Ireland simply as handball; Irish: liathróid láimhe) is a sport where players hit a ball with a hand or fist against a wall in such a way as to make a shot the opposition cannot return, and that may be played with two (singles) or four players (doubles). The sport, popular in Ireland, is similar to American handball, Welsh handball, Fives, Basque pelota, Valencian frontó, and more remotely to racquetball or squash. It is one of the four Gaelic games organised by the Gaelic Athletic Association (GAA). GAA Handball, a subsidiary organisation of the GAA, governs and promotes the sport.

== Rules ==
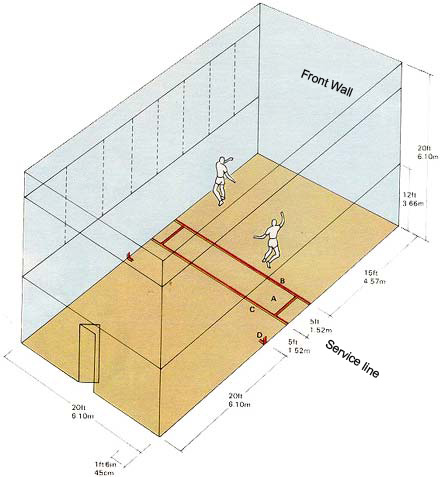
A typical Handball court

Handball is played in a court, or "alley". Originally, an alley measuring 60 by 30 feet (18.3 by 9.1 m) was used with a 30-foot (9.1 m) front wall, off which the ball must be struck.

A smaller alley was also introduced, measuring 40 by 20 feet (12.2 by 6.1 m) with a front wall 20 feet (6.1 m) high. The first alley of this size was built in Ireland in 1969. This smaller size is now the standard in the international version of the game, but both alleys are still used in the Gaelic game, with two separate championships run by the GAA in the two codes.

The objective of a game is to be the first to score a set total of points. Points are only scored by the person serving the ball. In other words, if a player wins a rally but did not serve at the start of that rally they only win the right to serve, and thus the chance to score after a subsequent rally. The serving player has two opportunities to hit the ball, from the "service area" (between the two parallel lines), off the "front wall" and across the "short line" (which is located exactly halfway down the court from the front wall).

Players take turns at hitting the ball off the "front wall" before the ball bounces twice on the floor of the court following their opponent's previous shot. Most handball games take place in a four-walled court but there are also three-walled and one-wall versions of the game.

== History ==
Handball-like games have originated in several places at different times. Hieroglyphs in the temple of Osiris in Egypt portray priests taking part in a game very similar to handball, and civilisations Mesoamerica and South America had a handball-like game.

An early origin for the game in Ireland is supported by recent archaeological finds in the Callan and Mooncoin areas of Kilkenny, which may indicate a Celtic antecedent to the modern game was played in the area in ancient times. An ancient Celtic version of the game is supported by the existence of Welsh handball (Welsh: Pêl-Law), a similar sport, which has been attested in the literature of Wales since the ninth century.

In Ireland, the earliest written record of a similar ball game is contained in the town statutes of Galway in 1527, which forbade the playing of ball games [generic] against the walls of the town. The first depiction of an Irish form of handball does not appear till 1785. On the west coast of Ireland, Galway had many trading links with Spain, especially the Basque regions, where the similar game of pelota is played. According to Dublin Handball GAA "It is highly likely that one game is derived from or influenced by the other.".

Irish immigrants brought the game to many countries in the 18th, 19th and 20th centuries. It is still played in the United States, Canada, Mexico, Australia, New Zealand, South Africa, Wales, Africa and England.

Father John Murphy, a leader in the 1798 rebellion was one of the best handball players of his time and he frequently held rebel meetings at his local handball alley.

=== Since the GAA ===
The GAA wrote the first rules for the modern game of handball. Handball was included in the GAA Charter of 1884 as one of the sports to be promoted by the new Association. In 1924 Comhairle Liathróid Láimhe na hÉireann (the Irish Handball Council) was established to promote, develop and organise the sport. In the same year the 'Irish Amateur Handball Association' was founded. It held its inaugural meeting on 27 January 1924 in Croke Park, County Dublin Prominent Irish republicans, Eoin O'Duffy and Ned Broy were members of this association, with O'Duffy serving as its president from 1926 till 1934. The association's work can be seen in corners of rural Ireland where there are many handball alleys in villages and small towns. However many are no longer used.

Prisoners detained in Gloucester Prison during the Irish revolutionary period played handball during their stay.

Taoiseach, President of Ireland and Irish revolutionary Éamon de Valera was a fan of the sport. He played it while interned in Gloucester Prison and also while held in Arbour Hill Prison. Austin Stack records in his diary (while in Arbour Hill Prison) that on 26 April 1924 "Dev [De Valera] beat me decisively a couple of times" at handball.

In 1925 the first All-Ireland Handball Congress was held and the All-Ireland Senior Softball and Hardball Championships were established

In 1971 Comhairle Liathróid Láimhe na mBan was founded to administer the sport for female competitions. In 1998 the amalgamation of Comhairle Liathróid Láimhe na hÉireann and Comhairle Liathróid Láimhe na mBan saw a single national administration. The Irish Handball Council was rebranded as GAA Handball (Liathróid Láimhe C.L.G.) in 2009.

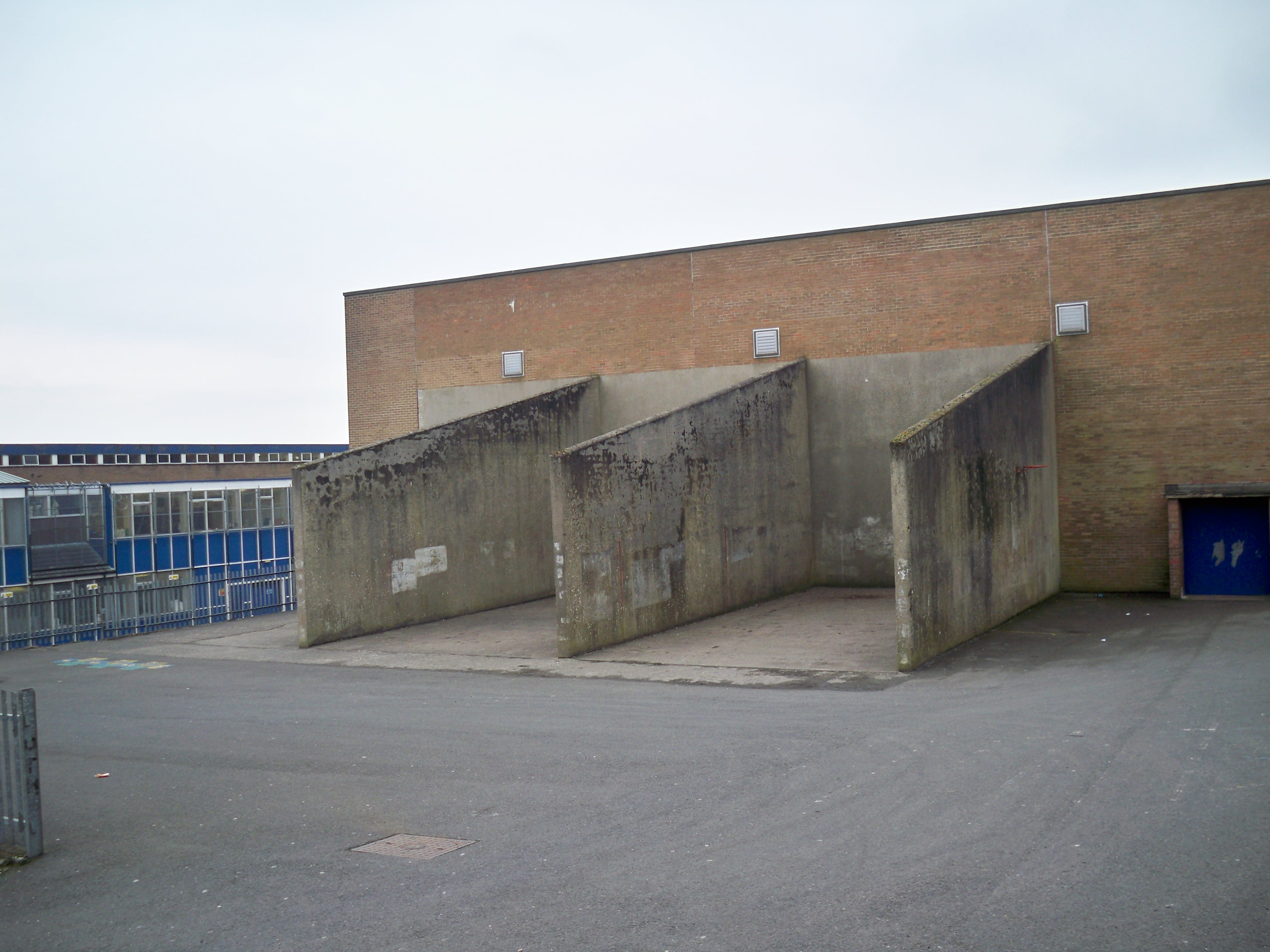
Open-ended school handball courts at Gort Na Móna Secondary School

== Types of handball ==
In Ireland, there are four forms or codes of handball. These include the two domestic codes:

- Softball (also known as 'big alley' or '60x30' from the playing court dimensions) is a code played in a large four-walled court measuring 60 by 30 feet (18 m × 9 m), played with a small 'Softball' rubber ball (typically red in colour). The code is played between June and October. According to a 2018 report by the GAA Handball Provincial Councils, Munster and South Leinster were then "strongholds" of the softball code, while "Ulster's progress in the code is severely hampered by the limited courts in the Province". The ceiling is not used as an area of play within the softball code.
- Hardball (can also be known as '60x30' interchangeably with the softball code), played in the same court as Softball, but as the name suggests, with a much harder 'hardball' ball. Hardball is recognised as a traditional code of the game. The code is more difficult to play due to the ball being much harder than any of the others used in the other codes. As a result, as of 2018, there were reportedly fewer players than in other codes (with, on average between 2013 and 2017, 34 entries between five grades (Senior, Minor, Intermediate, Junior and Masters Singles) nationally) and there were no grades offered in Ladies or Juvenile grades due to health and safety concerns. The ceiling is also not used as an area of play within the hardball code.

and two international as played in Ireland:

- 1-Wall (also known as 'Wallball') The 1-Wall code, as the name suggests, is played against a single wall measuring 20 by 16 feet (6 m × 5 m), with court lines marked out on both the wall and floor. It is played with a soft rubber ball (similar to a racquetball ball, softer than both a 4-Wall, Softball and Hardball ball) and can be played either indoors or outdoors. When serving or returning a ball, the ball must bounce firstly within the court lines on the wall and then also within the court lines marked out on the floor. 1-Wall Handball has emerged in the last decade as the fastest growing code of the game – the most recent Irish Wallball Nationals tournament held in Breaffy House, County Mayo in July 2019 attracted four hundred entries. The code's simplicity to play, combined with the accessibility of building multiple court venues enables clubs & GAA Handball to host larger scale tournaments. The international element of 1-Wall consists of a European Tour and World Championships as well as regional and national tournaments held abroad (US Nationals for example). And,
- 4-Wall (also known as '40x20' or 'small alley') is played within an indoor four-walled court, measuring forty feet by twenty feet (same as a racquetball court). It is played with a smaller but slightly harder rubber ball compared to the softball and one-wall balls and is a faster ball than the ones used in the other codes. The ceiling is used as an area of play within the 4-wall code. The 4-Wall code is regarded as the strongest code in Irish handball at present. It has a strong international dimension with the US Semi-Professional Tour and the World Championships, which are held every three years. As of 2018, Ireland had the top men's and ladies' Senior World Champions from the preceding five World Championships.

== Irish competitions ==
There are many handball competitions that are run in Ireland, such as the All-Ireland Senior Softball Singles Championship, All-Ireland Senior 4-Wall Championships and Irish Wallball Nationals to name a few. In 4-Wall, the main competitions are County, Province, and All-Ireland Championships plus the Irish 4-Wall Nationals. In 60x30 Softball and Hardball, the main competitions are County, Province, and All-Ireland Championships and the Junior B Interclub. In 2011 GAA Handball Ireland launched the 60x30 Softball Nationals and this competition will be held in July. In One-Wall handball/wallball, the main competition in Ireland is the Irish Wallball Nationals. There are also many competitions during the year held by various handball clubs around the country.

== Notable players ==
- Paul Brady, six time World 4-Wall Handball Champion
- Eoin Kennedy, winner of Irish and international singles and doubles championships
- John Lawlor, American and Irish Professional Champion, first president of the Irish Amateur Handball Association (1924–25)
- Michael (Ducksy) Walsh, multiple All-Ireland and World Handball Champion

== See also ==
- Gaelic Senior Softball Singles
- Gaelic Senior Hardball Singles
- Irish Collegiate Handball Association

Other modalities

- American handball
- Australian handball
- Basque Pelota
- International fronton
- Pêl-Law (Welsh handball)
- Valencian frontó
- Fives
