= GAA Handball =

Governing body for Gaelic handball

GAA Handball Ireland Liathróid Láimhe C.L.G. na hÉireann
- Formation: 1 November 1884; 141 years ago
- Type: Sports organisation
- Purpose: Management and promotion of Gaelic handball
- Headquarters: Croke Park, Dublin
- Region served: Ireland
- President: Conor McDonnell
- Parent organization: Gaelic Athletic Association (GAA)
- Website: gaahandball.ie

GAA Handball Ireland (Irish: Liathróid Láimhe C.L.G. na hÉireann) is the governing body for the sport of Gaelic handball in all of its codes in Ireland. Handball is one of the four Gaelic games organised by the Gaelic Athletic Association.

Its headquarters is located in Croke Park, Dublin. There are approximately 200 handball clubs in Ireland.

The national committee of GAA Handball is Ard Comhairle (the central council) on which the president sits as chairperson. As in the parent organisation, the Gaelic Athletic Association (GAA), the president is elected every three years. Joe Masterson held the role of President from 2017-2020. Dessie Keegan then took over from Masterson and served as President of the organisation from 2020-2023. Conor McDonnell took over from Keegan in February 2023 and will serve as president until 2026. Tom Moloney, who was appointed in an interim capacity in January 2022, was succeeded by David Britton as manager in Autumn 2022.

== Codes ==
GAA Handball oversees four forms or codes of Gaelic handball, two domestic:

- Softball (also known as 'big alley' or '60x30' from the playing court dimensions) is a code played in a large four-walled court measuring 60 ft by 30 ft, played with a small 'softball' rubber ball (typically red in colour).
- Hardball (can also be known as '60x30' interchangeably with the softball code), played in the same court as Softball, but as the name suggests, with a much harder 'hardball' ball. Hardball is typically recognised as a traditional code of the game.

and two international as played in Ireland:

- 1-Wall (also known as 'Wallball') The 1-Wall code, as the name suggests, is played against a single wall measuring 20 ft by 16 ft, with court lines marked out on both the wall and floor. It is played with a soft rubber ball (similar to a racquetball ball, softer than both a 4-Wall, Softball and Hardball ball) and can be played either indoors or outdoors. 1-Wall Handball is a fast-growing code of the game, and the 2019 Irish Wallball Nationals tournament attracted four hundred entries. The international element of 1-Wall consists of a European Tour and World Championships as well as regional and national tournaments held abroad (US Nationals for example). And,
- 4-Wall (also known as '40x20' or 'small alley') is played within an indoor four-walled court, measuring forty feet by twenty feet (same as a racquetball court). It is played with a smaller but slightly harder rubber ball compared to the softball and one-wall balls and is a faster ball than the ones used in the other codes. Unlike the other codes (where the ceiling is not used as an area of play) the ceiling is used within the 4-wall code. This code has a strong international dimension with the US Semi-Professional Tour and the World Championships, which are held every three years. Ireland has had the top men's and ladies' Senior World Champions in several World Championships. As of 2018, a number of proposals were made to change the structure of 4-Wall competitions, as there was a perceived "over saturation" of grades on offer.

== History ==
Since its foundation in 1884, the charter of the Gaelic Athletic Association has included handball as one of the sports to be promoted by the association. In 1924, the "Irish Handball Council" (rebranded as GAA Handball in 2009) was established to promote and develop the game.

From the 1940s to the 1970s, handball was popular in the Republic of Ireland. As years went by, handball lost its popularity. Since the re-branding of the Irish Handball Council in 2009 to GAA Handball, the sport has seen an increase in popularity including through the organisation's promotion of the One Wall code in schools. As part of this initiative, several hundred one-wall courts have been built in schools across Ireland. In 2012 Ireland hosted the World Handball Championships in the Citywest International Events Arena in Dublin, where a multi-court complex was erected to host the greatest International Handball event in history, with over 30 countries and 2,000+ competitors in attendance.

During the 2012 World Handball Championships, a new unified International Federation for the sport worldwide was established, the World Wall Ball Association (WWBA).

== National and international competitions ==
=== Irish competitions ===
There are many handball competitions that are run in Ireland. In 40x20, the main competitions are County, Province, and All-Ireland Championships plus the 40x20 Irish Nationals. In 60x30 Softball and Hardball. The main competition levels are County, Province, and All-Ireland Championships. In 2011 GAA Handball Ireland launched the 60x30 Nationals and this competition was held in July. In One-Wall handball, the main competition in Ireland is the Irish One-Wall Nationals, and this has been held in Breaffy House Sports Arena, Castlebar, since 2009. Competitions are also held during the year by various handball clubs around the country.

=== International competitions ===
As with the Irish competitions, there are many international one-wall and 40x20 competitions, the main one being the World Handball Championships which are run every 3 years. In 2012, the 'Worlds' was held in Ireland, in the Citywest International Events Arena in Dublin. The 2015 competition was held in Calgary, Alberta, Canada. The two codes of handball played in the World Handball Championships are 40x20 small court and One-Wall. In the 2009 World Handball Championships, players from Ireland won the 40x20 Senior Men's Singles (Paul Brady), Ladies Senior Singles (Aisling Reilly) and Ladies Doubles competitions (Fiona Shannon, Sibeal Gallagher).

== National Handball Centre ==
GAA Handball were granted planning approval in late 2017 to build a National Handball Centre at Croke Park.

As of February 2019, the centre was under development. The centre, located at the southeast corner of the stadium on Sackville Avenue, was close to completion as of early 2021, with the final minor stages of building delayed due to the COVID-19 coronavirus pandemic. The new centre contains three 4-Wall handball courts - including a three sided glass wall show court with amphitheatre style seating for a capacity of 500 spectators, a Softball show court with seating capacity for 200 spectators and three 1-Wall courts. It also contains offices for GAA Handball staff, a bar and cafe, and a community centre. The centre was used as a testing centre by Ireland's national health service, the Health Service Executive, during the COVID-19 pandemic.

While the centre's official opening was delayed due to both the COVID-19 pandemic as well as the final completion of remaining building works, the centre had a 'soft' opening in December 2021, allowing registered players to book the courts through Croke Park. The first competitive One-wall handball match took place in the centre in December 2022 during the European 1-Wall Tour "EliteStop" held in the Centre on Saturday 10 and Sunday 10 December 2022. The first competitive Four-wall handball matches to be played in the new centre are due to take place on Sunday, 2 April 2023 from 10am with the All-Ireland 4-Wall Senior Doubles semi-finals taking place in both Men's and Ladies codes.

== Media coverage ==
In late 2010, GAA Handball announced that it was to launch a new TV show on TG4 featuring highlights of the biggest competitions that were held over the preceding months. In mid to late December of that year, TG4 premiered the first ever edition of the GAA Handball show and it was followed by a six-part series that was broadcast in January 2011. Following the broadcast of these six episodes, a new series, of 8 episodes, was broadcast from January 2012. Further television coverage was shown on RTÉ, TG4, TV3 and Sky Sports for the 2012 All Ireland 40x20 Open Championships and for the 2012 World Championships.
