= Valencian frontó =

Frontó (Valencian: [fɾonˈto]) is a modified Valencian pilota version of the original Basque pelota game. The name frontó refers both to the game, ball and the playing area. Unlike some of the more popular Valencian pilota rules, frontó is an indirect game, that is, players do not stand face-to-face but share a common playing area.

== History ==
The first frontó in Valencia is dated in the late 1800s, and was called the Jai Alai (Basque for "joyful party"). On 12 June 1894 the newspaper El Mercantil announced one of the first matches with 4 Basque players.

After its foreign origins, Valencian frontó evolved with the use of a different ball, the tec, so that it has more in common with Valencian pilota. So far, though, it has not gained as much popularity as the escala i corda or raspall rule variations, the only version of pilota with professional players.

Valencian and Basque pilota/pelota players now meet in casual tournaments or exhibitions despite the use of different balls and different court sizes.

== Playing area ==
A Valencian frontó is a rectangular flat three-walled courtfield:

- The frontis is a wall where players throw a ball to so that it bounces over a line 90 cm tall..
- The wall is left from the frontis and 25 m long. There are ten vertical lines (the blau) used for players to place themselves and to mark the "fault line" and the "pass line".
- The rebound is the opposite wall of the frontis. On the ground there is a 45° besel (the tamborí) for low balls to bounce high.

The side wall has 10 numbered vertical lines used for players to stand in their positions and to locate two lines: The fault line, at the 4, marks the closest place to the "frontis" where the serving ball may be bounced on the ground, and the pass line, at the 7, signals the farthest place from the "frontis" where the ball may bounce when serving.

Spectators usually sit on stairs or chairs placed where the fourth wall would stand, after an area called contracanxa, which is used to play openly bouncing balls. Under normal Valencian Pilota rules, public stands aren't separate from the playing area.

== Ball ==
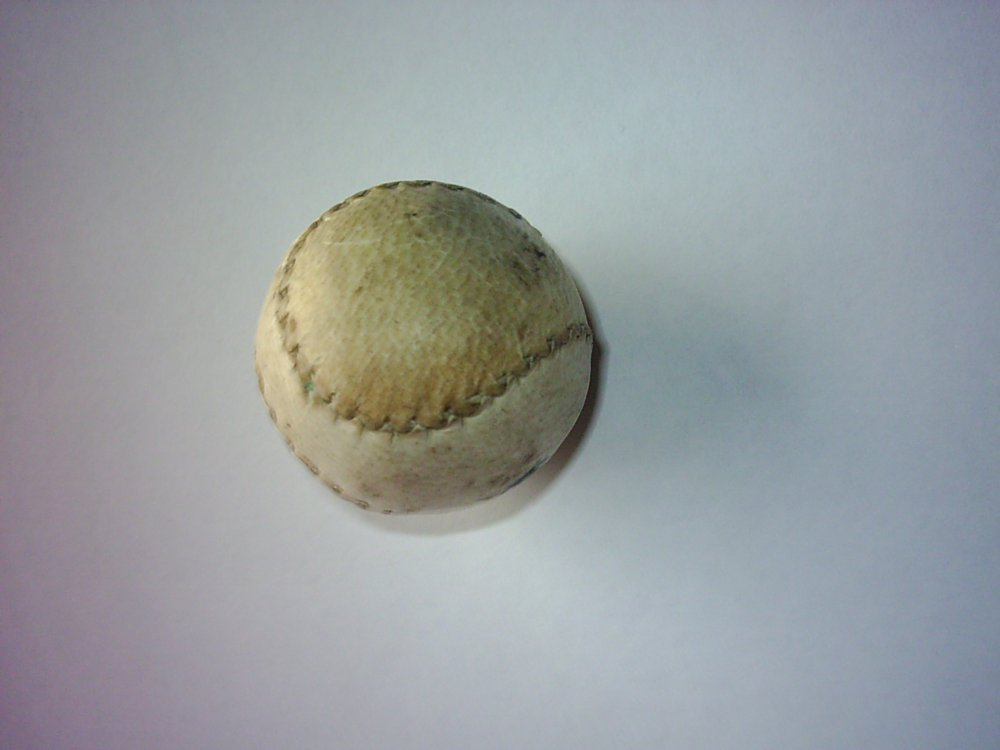
Tec ball

Valencian frontó is played with a tec ball, made of goat skin. The ball weighs 45–50 grams (1.6–1.8 oz), and has a diameter of 38–40 millimetres (1.5–1.6 in).

== Rules ==
A "frontó" match may be played one-on-one or by teams formed by 2 players. As players use the same playing area, they must have different colored clothing to distinguish themselves. Usually, whichever player is the 'favorite' to win wears red, while the other player wears blue.

Due to influence of the Basque pelota now it is usual to use the Basque scoring, which goes to 22 points. The Valencian Pilota Federation, however, plays its tournaments under the traditional Valencian rules:

A match is played until one of the teams attain 40 points, counted 5 by 5, being each one a joc Every team, alternatively, serves for a whole joc, which consists in 4 quinzes: 15, 30, val and game. Whoever wins the "val" gets the "joc" and scores 5 points.

A quinze begins when a player bounces the ball before the "fault line" and throws it to the "frontis" wall, after it rebounds it must pass the "fault line" without going over the "pass line". Every team hits the ball alternatively with their hands, sending it to the "frontis" over a 90 cm horizontal line after a first bounce on the ground or when it is still in the air. If the ball passes the "pass line", the teams serve the ball again.

The "quinze" is won when the opposing team can not throw back the ball according to these rules or commits a fault:

- If the ball does not reach the "frontis" wall.
- If, in the service, the ball does not reach the "fault line".
- If the ball hits under the 90 cm horizontal line on the "frontis", or goes over the "frontis" or side walls.
- If the ball bounces twice on the ground, or it bounces once outside the court.
- If ball is not hit with the hand.

== See also ==
- Valencian pilota
  - Frare

Other versions

- Basque pelota
- Gaelic handball
- Pêl-Law (Welsh handball)
