= U22 (album) =

U22: A 22 Track Live Collection from U2360°

Live album by U2
- Released: 30 May 2012
- Recorded: July 2009 – July 2011
- Venue: Various locations during U2360° Tour
- Genre: Rock
- Length: 128:44
- Label: Universal-Island
- Producer: Declan Gaffney

U2 chronology
Duals (2011)	U22: A 22 Track Live Collection from U2360° (2012)	From the Ground Up: Edge's Picks from U2360° (2012)

U22: A 22 Track Live Collection from U2360° is a live album released by the Irish rock band U2 in May 2012 only available to u2.com subscribers. The 22 tracks were voted for by subscribers to U2.com.

== Track listing ==
Disc one
No.	Title	Recorded at	Length
1.	"Even Better Than the Real Thing"	Estadio Azteca, Mexico City, 15 May 2011	4:26
2.	"The Fly"	Spartan Stadium, East Lansing, 26 June 2011	5:07
3.	"Mysterious Ways"	Cape Town Stadium, Cape Town, 18 February 2011	4:44
4.	"Magnificent"	Stadion Letzigrund, Zurich, 11 September 2010	5:32
5.	"Until the End of the World"	Estadio Azteca, Mexico City, 14 May 2011	5:48
6.	"I Still Haven't Found What I'm Looking For" (featuring Hugh Masekela on flugelhorn)	FNB Stadium, Johannesburg, 13 February 2011	5:13
7.	"Stay (Faraway, So Close!)"	Soldier Field, Chicago, 5 July 2011	4:52
8.	"One Tree Hill"	Mt Smart Stadium, Auckland, 26 November 2010	5:24
9.	"Beautiful Day"	Stadion Maksimir, Zagreb, 10 August 2009	6:23
10.	"Elevation"	Veltins-Arena, Gelsenkirchen, 3 August 2009	4:02
11.	"Bad"	Stadio Olimpico, Rome, 8 October 2010	8:09
Total length:			59:40

Disc Two
No.	Title	Recorded at	Length
1.	"All I Want is You/Love Rescue Me"	ANZ Stadium, Sydney, 14 December 2010	9:58
2.	"The Unforgettable Fire"	Ullevi Stadion, Gothenburg, 31 July 2009	4:49
3.	"Zooropa"	M&T Bank Stadium, Baltimore, 22 June 2011	4:32
4.	"City of Blinding Lights"	Parc Des Sports Charles-Ehrmann, Nice, 15 July 2009	5:31
5.	"MLK/Walk On"	Stadion Maksimir, Zagreb, 9 August 2009	8:43
6.	"One"	Hampden Park, Glasgow, 18 August 2009	5:26
7.	"Where the Streets Have No Name"	Stadion Ślaski, Chorzów, 6 August 2009	5:24
8.	"Ultraviolet (Light My Way)"	Estádio Cidade de Coimbra, Coimbra, 3 October 2010	5:14
9.	"With or Without You"	Wembley Stadium, London, 14 August 2009	5:55
10.	"Moment of Surrender"	Subiaco Oval, Perth, 18 December 2010	8:10
11.	"Out of Control"	Hippodrome de Montréal, Montreal, 9 July 2011	5:22
Total length:			69:04

Bonus track (digital download)
No.	Title	Length
1.	"Unknown Caller" (Live from U2360°)	6:22
