= Welsh handball =

Sport native to Wales

Welsh handball (Welsh: Pêl-law) is one of the ancient native sports of Wales. It is related to coeval sports such as Irish handball, fives, and Basque pelota and is a possible antecedent of American handball. The sport has been continually attested since the Middle Ages and its popularity saw it become an important expression of Welsh culture, offering ordinary people opportunities through prize money, bookkeeping and even player professionalism.

Due to its cultural significance games of Pêl-law were simply referred to as Chwarae Pêl (playing ball) and it has since been described as "Wales’s first national sport".

== Rules and scoring ==
Pêl-law shares many rules and its methods of scoring with other handball games, as well as squash and racquetball. A hard, leather-cased ball (a Spaldeen is often used today) is struck with the palm against a front wall. The objective is to keep the ball out of the opponent's reach but inside the bounds of play so that they are unable to return. The ball must hit the wall and remain within the court markings, or a point is awarded to the opposition. A return shot offers players the chance to make a "kill shot", where the ball is hit so low that it makes it impossible for the opposition to return any shot. Games are usually one on one, but pairs and other variations are also played.

Scores are marked on the front wall using the traditional "box" scoring system, and formal matches are overseen by an official score marker and one referee. Whilst historically the rules varied from village to village, the scoring method remained constant and is still in use today.

== History ==
=== Early development ===
Similar games to Pêl-law have been played throughout the world for thousands of years. Handball-like games have originated in several places at different times. Hieroglyphs in the temple of Osiris in Egypt portray priests taking part in a game very similar to handball. The Civilisations of South and Central America had a handball-like game, which was a large part of pre-Columbian culture. It is likely that the Welsh game has a similarly ancient origin.

Pêl-law has been attested in the literature of Wales since the Middle Ages, and was mentioned by Nennius in the ninth century. There is evidence that the game was played at Tintern Abbey and Raglan Castle once held a Pêl-law court inside its Great Hall of State.

=== Importance to Welsh culture ===
By the 15th century, the widespread understanding of pêl-law was great enough that the bard Guto'r Glyn wrote a popular cywydd for the game, simply entitled Y Bêl (English: The Ball). However, the sport's popularity became an issue in the Tudor period, as the government imposed greater restrictions on public life and the sport was banned by order of the English Crown. Sports were banned for a number of reasons, but in Wales they were particularly seen as a distraction from the practice of archery as Welsh longbowmen were integral to the defence of the kingdom.

The banned sports were also seen as encouraging gambling, violence and debauchery with only Christmas (and later Easter) seeing the ban relaxed. As sports enjoyed by the English nobility (such as jousting, bear-baiting and cock-fighting) continued with no such restrictions, the outlawed sports came to be seen as an expression of protest against the landowning class. This social context was exacerbated in Wales as authorities continued to characterise pêl-law games as havens of mob behavior, sedition and ultimately revolt. Similarly, the Laws in Wales Acts (1535 and 1542) removed historic Welsh institutions and barred Welsh people (or English people with Welsh connections) from positions of authority. As a result of these changes, the surviving Welsh folk-pursuits (such as pêl-law) gained a unique cultural significance for ordinary people.

=== National sport ===
The game was initially played against the side of stone buildings like churches or castles, and the sport's popularity among the Welsh populace drew the ire of both Anglican and Non-conformist leaders, with one Methodist preacher telling his congregations that handball was among the things which were “taking the country to eternal woe”.

Who Ever hear on a Sonday,
Will Practis Playing At Ball,
it May Be before Monday,
The Devil Will Have you All.

— Early evidence of the strained relationship between Pêl-law and community leaders, inscribed onto St Mary's Church in Llanvair Discoed.

The 18th century saw the construction of the first purpose-built courts. The new open-backed courts were often built by the owners of public houses to attract trade and the new venues enabled Pêl-law unprecedented popularity as a spectator sport. However, the new crowds drew more complaints from landowners, who would often refer to the games as 'fives' a very similar game played by English grammar schools. In 1744 a Joanna Lond of Swansea was accused of: "maintaining a certain gaming house for a certain unlawful game called fives" and a letter written in 1817, states the author’s objection to the transformation of the courtyard of the church at Llandaff into a "Fives court", with games interrupting services. It is likely that such instances actually helped the game maintain a distinct attraction. With Welsh language terminology, an archaic scoring system and distinct working-class culture, any vilification by the Anglican church or local authority appear to have only added to the sport's unique appeal. This era also saw Pêl-law become popular in the west of England.

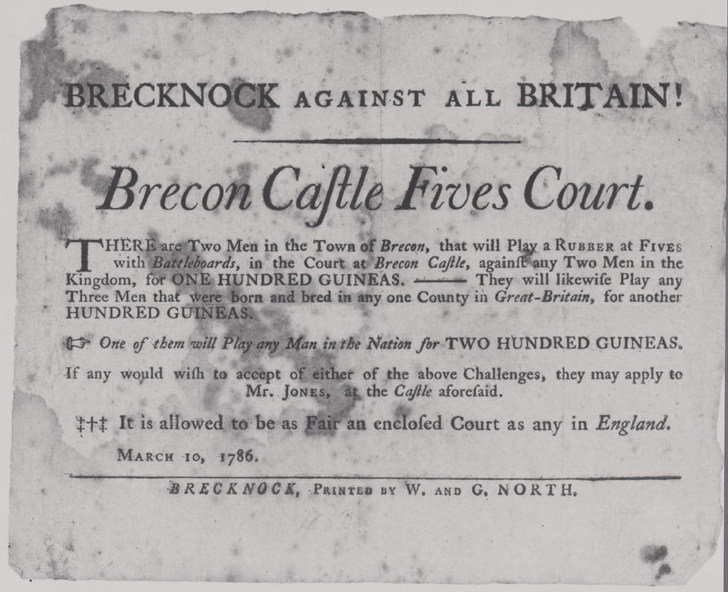
Brecknock against all Britain! Brecon Castle Fives Court. A Pêl-law challenge for prize money by two local champions referring to the game by the English name of Fives (1786)

The late 19th century also saw a great number of workers move to Wales and it seems the increasing population enjoyed the sport. Irish handball was a related working-class sport and it is understood that Irish migrants played the Welsh game, with the construction of the Nelson court in the 1860s possibly built with Irish railway workers in mind.

=== Professional development ===
With Wales' industrial development, and the sport's continued popularity, vast numbers were now able to spectate or compete and yet more players became professionals, leading to great rivalries between communities.

One of the first names of national renown was Richard Edwards ("champion of every church yard in Denbighshire"). Local champions like Billy Newnam of Llantrisant and the "terrible Treharne twins" of Pontypridd also enjoyed widespread fame and adulation. It was common for competitors to travel between villages and towns to challenge the champions of other localities, often for large sums of money.

By the 1870s, Dr Ifor Ajax-Lewis of Llantrisant and Richard Andrews, a miner from Nelson were offering enormous prize money to any player who could beat them. Andrews, known affectionately as ‘Dic Ted’ was particularly admired. Playing throughout the 1870s he played in many famous matches such as that against the 19 year old Peter Price. Peter was another miner at the nearby Taff Bargoed colliery, and their showdown was played in front of an especially large crowd at the Harp Inn in Gelligaer. Andrews would play a match against W Jones of New Tredegar for a then record purse of £20. By 1875, the record winnings had increased to £1000.

=== Decline ===
Wales endured great economic and cultural changes in the early twentieth century, with the boom Edwardian years (which saw the Welsh population grow more than 20%) followed by war, economic uncertainty and numerous industrial disasters. This societal turmoil was reflected by a decline in traditional Welsh activities such as Pêl-law, while further advances in transportation made it easier for teams and supporters to travel to the increasingly popular team sports like rugby.

The Great Depression saw a notable transformation and revival of the sport, with Pêl-law again becoming popular as an informal and almost costless street game for impoverished workers. The revival was especially prevalent in the Swansea area, where street versions were a notable feature throughout the city as late as the 1960s.

=== International matches ===
The World Handball Championships both singles and pairs competitions were held annually at the Nelson court, throughout the 1970s and 1980s. In 1987, the Welsh Handball Association was formed to both preserve the Welsh game and coordinate international matches with nations playing similar games to Pêl-law. In 1995 markings for One Wall Handball were made within the three-walled Nelson court and in May that year the inaugural European One Wall Handball Tournament was held in Wales. Attended by representatives from Ireland, England, Belgium and even the USA. The tournament was based at Nelson, with Caerphilly and Bargoed also hosting matches. The new international competitions saw Welsh success in 1997 when Nelson's Lee Davies (Welsh champion throughout the 1990s) became World Champion.

== Revival ==
In August 2022, A group of former players re-established the Welsh Wallball Association at Nelson, with the aim of once again, reviving the sport and playing international competition. While a full domestic Men's league was played in the summer of 2022, a Wales national team was also entered into both the European Championships in Belgium and the European 1-Wall Tour. The next year, the association had grown to 40 members and established both a children's and women's league. In the European Championships, Wales finished second their group, narrowly missing out on qualifying for the quarter finals on points deficit.

== Courts ==
Local courts were simply known as Y Plaen ('the plain') or Plaen Pêl ('ball plain'). These courts hosted both singles and pairs matches, and tended to be three walled structures (although one walled courts were also built). Courts were built all over Wales but especially in Glamorgan during the eighteenth and nineteenth centuries. Today there are surviving courts at Llantrisant, Pontypridd, Laugharne, Mountain Ash and Ystrad Rhondda. However, all these courts are overgrown, partially demolished or unplayable. Only the Jersey Marine and Nelson courts are known to have survived largely complete, with the Nelson Court believed to be the only one to still be continually maintained.

=== Jersey Marine ===
Another surviving handball court is Burrows Court in Jersey Marine. The Court was built in 1864 by brewery owner Evan Evans. The court features a stone heart set in the highest wall and an inscription which reads Gwrol Galon Hyd Angau (a brave heart till death). This emblem is that of the 17th Glamorgan Volunteer Rifle Corps and it is thought that the court may have been used as a rifle range for the volunteers’ target practice.

It was here in 1875 that Dr Ivor Ajax-Lewis, the handball champion for Llantrisant, defeated Mr Lovett, the champion of Neath, in a celebrated match with £1,000 in betting stakes.

=== The Nelson Court ===
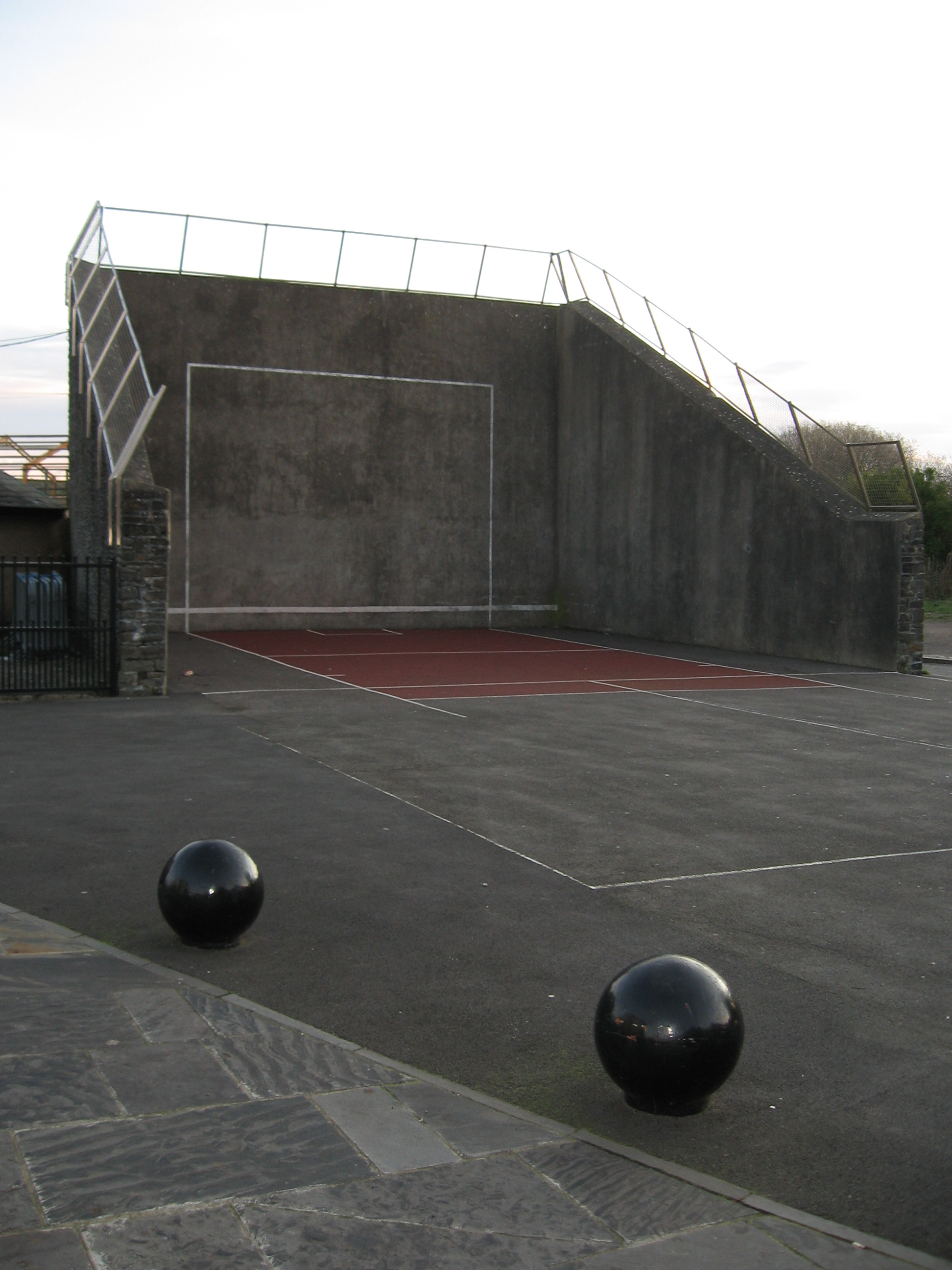
The three-walled Nelson Court is now a Listed building

The Old Ball Court in Nelson is a three-sided handball court constructed in 1853. The unique design is based upon the earlier court at the yard of the Nelson Inn. The landlord of the Royal Oak constructed the new court to entice more customers, especially from the Nelson Inn.

The court elevated Nelson to a major centre for the game with all the great players of their day gracing the court accompanied by large excited crowds and much betting. The Nelson court was also famous for its annual tournaments held between May and August and accompanied by high levels of gambling. The court length was reduced in the 1990s due to safety concerns from the increasing traffic through the village.

In May 1995, the first European Handball Tournament was held at Nelson and was attended by American, Belgian, English, Irish, and Welsh teams. Recent notable players include Lee Davies, who was Welsh champion throughout the 1990s and became World Handball Champion in 1997.

The Eton Fives Yearbook (1994–95) commented:

“Admittedly the weather was excellent, but I would ask you to envisage a court situated right in the middle of a Welsh village, with a local pub literally on the left hand side of the court and a row of terraced houses on the right, and the main road and shops behind. On Finals day you could mingle with the local spectators. We saw the soul of handball in Wales this May. This year the court there became the centre of village life. We saw the game as it was originally devised, a street game, a game of the people.”

Today, the game remains a unique feature of the village with a seating area built for spectators in 2010.

=== New Courts ===
The modern revival has seen the establishment of a new court at Trelewis. The court was funded by Wyndham Stokes and constructed as an indoor alternative to the traditional courts, allowing competition to continue throughout the winter. The Welsh Handball Association also announced plans to modernise the Nelson court and maintain around six courts to facilitate tournaments.
