= List of American Handball Champions in the United States =

This page lists national champions in American handball (wall handball) in the United States, organized by year and division. For 3 wall and 1 wall, singles champions are "Open" unless "Pro" is shown.

Year	4W Pro Singles	4W Open Singles	4W Open Doubles	3W Singles	3W Open Doubles	1W Singles	1W Open Doubles
1919		Bill Ranft	Ranft / Joe Lacey				
1920		Max Gold	Gge. Klawiter / Gge. Retzer				
1921		Carl Haedge	Stan Spiegel / Wilfred Asselin				
1922		Art Shinners	Maynard Laswell / Max Gold				
1923		Joe Murray	Joe Bathe / Russ Serrenberg				
1924		Maynard Laswell	Lane McMillin / Jack Donovan				
1925		Maynard Laswell	Wm.Kamman / Herm Dworman				
1926		Maynard Laswell	Lane McMillian / J. Donovan				
1927		George Nelson	Wm.Kamman / Herm Dworman				
1928		Joe Griffin	Kamman / Al Schaufelberger				
1929		Al Banuet	Al Banuet / Lane McMillin				
1930		Al Banuet	Al Banuet / Woody Paynter				
1931		Al Banuet	Joe Bathe / Herm Dworman				
1932		Angelo Trulio	Angelo Trulio / M. Laswell				
1933		Sam Atcheson	Joe Goudreau / John Endzvick				
1934		Sam Atcheson	Henry Herz / Leo Manka				
1935		Joe Platak	Andy Berry / Joe Gordon				
1936		Joe Platak	Andy Berry / Joe Gordon				
1937		Joe Platak	Joe Platak / Bob Weiller				
1938		Joe Platak	Frank Coyle / Ed Linz				
1939		Joe Platak	Frank Coyle / Ed Linz				
1940		Joe Platak	Joe Gordon / Joe Goldsmith				
1941		Joe Platak	Frank Coyle / Ed Linz				
1942		Jack Clements	Joe Gordon / Harold Smith				
1943		Joe Platak	Joe Gordon / Harold Smith				
1944		Frank Coyle	Joe Platak / Bob Quinn				
1945		Joe Platak	Sam Atcheson / Walt Detwiller				
1946		Angelo Trulio	Frank Coyle / Ed Linz				
1947		Gus Lewis	Sam Haber / Joe Samson				
1948		Gus Lewis	Frank Gluckler / Dave Pahl				
1949		Vic Hershkowitz	Gus Lewis / Sam Haber				
1950		Ken Schneider	Frank Coyle / Bill Baier	Vic Hershkowitz	Frank Glucker / Marshall Leher		
1951		Walter Plekan	Frank Coyle / Bill Baier	Vic Hershkowitz	Frank Coyle / Bill Baier		
1952		Vic Hershkowitz	Frank Coyle / Bill Baier	Vic Hershkowitz	Leo Dressier / Phil Collins		
1953		Bob Brady	Sam Haber / Harry Dreyfus	Vic Hershkowitz	Sam Haber / Bill Baier		
1954		Vic Hershkowitz	Sam Haber / Ken Schneider	Vic Hershkowitz	Gus Lewis / Phil Collins		
1955		Jimmy Jacobs	Sam Haber / Ken Schneider	Vic Hershkowitz	Gus Lewis / Phil Collins		
1956		Jimmy Jacobs	John Sloan / Phil Collins	Vic Hershkowitz	Vic Hershkowitz / Harry Dreyfus		
1957		Jimmy Jacobs	John Sloan / Phil Collins	Vic Hershkowitz	Ruby Obert / Oscar Obert		
1958		John Sloan	John Sloan / Phil Collins	Vic Hershkowitz	John Sloan / Bob Brady		
1959		John Sloan	John Sloan / Phil Collins	Jimmy Jacobs	Ruby Obert / Oscar Obert	Oscar Obert	Ruby Obert / Oscar Obert
1960		Jimmy Jacobs	Jim Jacobs / Dick Weisman	Jimmy Jacobs	Ruby Obert / Oscar Obert	Oscar Obert	Ruby Obert / Oscar Obert
1961		Johnny Sloan	Sloan / Vic Hershkowitz	Jimmy Jacobs	Charlie and Joe Danilczyk	Oscar Obert	Ruby Obert / Oscar Obert
1962		Oscar Obert	Jim Jacobs / Marty Decatur	Oscar Obert	Marty Decatur / Johnny Sloan	Ken Davidoff	Ruby Obert / Oscar Obert
1963		Oscar Obert	Jimmy Jacobs / Marty Decatur	Marty Decatur	Decatur / Lou Russo	Oscar Obert	Ruby Obert / Oscar Obert
1964		Jim Jacobs	John Sloan / Phil Elbert	Marty Decatur	Ruby Obert / Oscar Obert	Oscar Obert	Norvid / J. Danilczyk
1965		Jim Jacobs	Jacobs / Marty Decatur	Carl Obert	Ruby Obert / Oscar Obert	Oscar Obert	Wally Ulbrich / Holmes
1966		Paul Haber	Pete Tyson / Bob Lindsay	Marty Decatur	Decatur / Lou Russo	Steve Sandler	J. Danilczyk / Artie Reyer
1967		Paul Haber	Jim Jacobs / Marty Decatur	Carl Obert	Oscar Obert / Ruby Obert	Steve Sandler	J. Danilczyk / Artie Reyer
1968		Stuffy Singer	Jim Jacobs / Marty Decatur	Marty Decatur	Decatur / Lou Russo	Steve Sandler	Carl Obert / Ruby Obert
1969		Paul Haber	Lou Russo / Lou Kramberg	Marty Decatur	Marty Decatur / Lou Russo	Steve Sandler	Lou Russo / Joel Wisotsky
1970		Paul Haber	Carl Obert / Ruby Obert	Steve August	Paul Haber / Andy Upatnieks	Steve Sandler	Steve Sandler / Don Weber
1971		Paul Haber	Ray Neveau / Simie Fein	Lou Russo	Paul Haber / Andy Upatnieks	Steve Sandler	Artie Reyer / Wally Ulbrich
1972		Fred Lewis	Kent Fusselman / Al Drews	Lou Russo	Joel Wisotsky / Ruby Obert	Wally Ulbrich	Wally Ulbrich / Mark Levine
1973		Terry Muck	Ray Neveau / Simie Fein	Paul Haber	Joel Wisotsky / Ruby Obert	Steve Sandler	Lou Russo / Joel Wisotsky
1974	Fred Lewis		Ray Neveau / Simie Fein	Fred Lewis	Marty Decatur / Paul Haber	Al Torres	Joel Wisotsky / Wally Ulbrich
1975	Fred Lewis	Jay Bileu	Steve Lott / Marty Decatur	Lou Russo	Joel Wisotsky / Wally Ulbrich		
1976	Fred Lewis	Vern Roberts	Gary Rohrer / Dan O'Connor	Lou Russo	Joel Wisotsky / Wally Ulbrich		
1977	Naty Alvarado		Skip McDowell / Matt Kelly	Lou Russo	Vern Roberts / Dave Dohman	Al Torres	Torres / Artie Reyer
1978	Fred Lewis		Stuffy Singer / Marty Decatur	Fred Lewis	Vern Roberts / Dave Dohman	Stu Kirzner	John Edwards / John Reicher
1979	Naty Alvarado		Stuffy Singer / Marty Decatur	Lou Russo	John Sabo / Ken Ginty	Flip Wolfarth	Joel Wisotsky / Howie Eisenberg
1980	Naty Alvarado		Skip McDowell / Harry Robertson	Lou Russo	Vern Roberts / Alvarado	Al Torres	Joel Wisotsky / Howie Eisenberg
1981	Fred Lewis		Tom Kopatich / Jack Roberts	Naty Alvarado	Vern Roberts / Alvarado	Steve Sandler	Mark Levine / Artie Reyer
1982	Naty Alvarado		Alvarado / Vern Roberts	Naty Alvarado	Vern Roberts / Alvarado	Joe Durso	Mark Levine / Neal Bocian
1983	Naty Alvarado		Alvarado / Vern Roberts	Naty Alvarado	Vern Roberts / Alvarado	Al Torres	Joe Durso / Al Apuzzi
1984	Naty Alvarado		Alvarado / Vern Roberts	Naty Alvarado	Vern Roberts / Alvarado	Joe Durso	Durso / Al Apuzzi
1985	Naty Alvarado	Tony Ryan	Alvarado / Vern Roberts	Vern Roberts	Roberts / Naty Alvarado	Ed Golden	Al Torres / Al Apuzzi
1986	Naty Alvarado	Tony Ryan	Jon Kendler / Poncho Monreal	Vern Roberts (Pro)	Richard Lopez / Vince Munoz	Al Apuzzi	Durso / Al Apuzzi
1987	Naty Alvarado	Ken Ginty	Jon Kendler / Poncho Monreal	Vern Roberts (Pro)	Ken Ginty / Eric Klarman	Joe Durso (Pro)	Durso / Al Apuzzi
1988	Naty Alvarado	David Steinberg	Doug Glatt / Dennis Haynes	Jon Kendler (Pro)	John Bike / Dave Dohman	Joe Durso (Pro)	Durso / Al Apuzzi
1989	Poncho Monreal	David Steinberg	Danny Bell / Charlie Kalil	John Bike (Pro)	John Bike / Dave Dohman	Joe Durso (Pro)	Durso / Al Apuzzi
1990	Naty Alvarado	David Chapman	Doug Glatt / Rod Prince	Vince Munoz (Pro)	John Bike / Dave Dohman	Joe Durso (Pro)	Eric Klarman / Danny Maroney
1991	John Bike Jr.	Lennart DeLa Torre	John Bike Jr. / Octavio Silveyra	John Bike (Pro)	Bike / Dave Dohman	Joe Durso (Pro)	Joe & Paul Lonegran
1992	Octavio Silveyra	John Davis	D. Chapman / Naty Alvarado Jr.	John Bike (Pro)	Bike / Dave Dohman	Joe Durso (Pro)	Al Apuzzi / Ed Golden
1993	David Chapman	Ed Corbett	Chapman / Naty Alvarado Jr.	Eric Klarman (Pro)	Dave Chapman / Klarman	Al Apuzzi (Pro)	Al Torres / Robert Sostre
1994	Octavio Silveyra	Kris Schaumann	Silveyra / John Bike	David Chapman (Pro)	Chapman / Eric Klarman	Joe Durso (Pro)	Ed Maisonet / Paul Williams
1995	David Chapman	Chris Rusing	Chapman / Naty Alvarado Jr.	David Chapman (Pro)	Chapman / John Bike	Ed Maisonet (Pro)	Ed Maisonet / Paul Williams
1996	David Chapman	Justin Balkenbush	Jonn Bike / Octavio Silveyra	Vince Munoz (Pro)	Munoz / Octavio Silveyra	Ed Maisonet (Pro)	Robert Sostre / Al Torres
1997	Octavio Silveyra	Dan Armijo	Jonn Bike / Octavio Silveyra	Vince Munoz	John Bike / Dave Dohman	Robert Sostre (Pro)	Tony Roberts / Dave Rojas
1998	David Chapman	John Libby	Dave Chapman / Vince Munoz	Vince Munoz (Pro)	John Bike / Dave Dohman	Ed Maisonet (Pro)	Anthony Roberts / Dave Rojas
1999	David Chapman	Eoin Kennedy	David Chapman / Vince Munoz	Vince Munoz (Pro)	Vince Munoz / Eddie Chapa	Joe Kaplan (Pro)	Eddie Maisonet / Paul Williams
2000	David Chapman	Dean Crispen	David Chapman / Vince Munoz	Vince Munoz (Pro)	Vince Munoz / Eddie Chapa	Robert Sostre (Pro)	Joe Kaplan / Cesar Sala
2001	Vince Munoz	Dessie Keegan (IRE.)	Nati Alvarado Jr. / John Bike Jr.	Vince Munoz (Pro)	Vince Munoz / Eddie Chapa	Cesar Sala (Pro)	David Rojas / John Wright
2002	David Chapman	Richard McCann	David Chapman / Vince Munoz	Vince Munoz (Pro)	Vince Munoz / Eddie Chapa	Pee Wee Castro (Pro)	Pee Wee Castro / Anthony Roberts
2003	John Bike Jr.	Rayan Grossenbacher	Norm Dunne / Marcos Chavez	Vince Munoz (Pro)	Marcos Chavez / Sean Lenning	Tony Roberts (Pro)	Pee Wee Castro / Joe Durso
2004	David Chapman	Ryan Grossenbacher	Marcos Chavez / Vince Munoz	Sean Lenning (Pro)	Marcos Chavez / Sean Lenning	Satish Jagnandan (Pro)	Pee Wee Castro / Willie Polanco
2005	Paul Brady (Ire.)		Tony Healy / Richard McCann (Ire.)	Vince Munoz (Pro)	Vince Munoz / Eddie Chapa	Satish Jagnandan (Pro)	Tony Roberts / Robert Sostre
2006		Paul Brady (Ire.)	Paul Brady / Michael Finnegan (Ire.)	Emmett Peixto (Pro)	Sean Lenning / Eddie Chapa	Satish Jagnandan (Pro)	Cesar Sala / Joe Kaplan
2007		Paul Brady (Ire.)	Tony Healy / Ricky McCann (Ire.)	Sean Lenning (Pro)	Sean Lenning / Marcos Chavez	Satish Jagnandan (Pro)	Cesar Sala / Joe Kaplan
2008		Paul Brady (Ire.)	Emmett Peixoto / David Chapman	Sean Lenning (Pro)	Sean Lenning / Emmett Peixoto	Cesar Sala (Pro)	Willie Polanco / Pee Wee Castro
2009		Paul Brady (Ire.)	Emmett Peixoto / David Chapman	Emmett Peixoto (Pro)	Sean Lenning / Luis Moreno	Satish Jagnandan (Pro)	Willie Polanco / Pee Wee Castro
2010		Paul Brady (Ire.)	Tom Sheridan / Ducksy Walsh(Ire.)	David Chapman (Pro)	David Chapman / Bill Mehilos	Tyree Bastides (Pro)	Willie Polanco / Pee Wee Castro
2011		David Chapman	Sean Lenning / Armando Ortiz	Sean Lenning (Pro)	David Chapman / Bill Mehilos	Pee Wee Castro (Pro)	Joe Kaplan / Cesar Sala
2012		Paul Brady	Luis Moreno / Andy Nett	Sean Lenning (Pro)	Adam Szatkowski / Dane Szatkowski	John Wright (Pro)	PeeWee Castro / Willie Polanco
2013		Paul Brady	Nikolai Nahorniak / Tyree Bastidas	Tyree Bastidas (Pro)	Sean Lenning / Daniel Cordova	Tyree Bastidas (Pro)	Alvaro Rebaza / Givonni Vazquez
2014		Paul Brady	Charly Shanks / Andy Nett	Sean Lenning (Pro)	Braulio Ruiz / Armando Ortiz	Tyree Bastidas (Pro)	William Polanco / Michael Schneider
2015		Paul Brady	Sean Lenning / Marcos Chavez	Sean Lenning (Pro)	Sean Lenning / Marcos Chavez	Tyree Bastidas (Pro)	Tyree Bastidas / Billy O’Donnell
2016		Killian Carroll	Sean Lenning / Marcos Chavez	Sean Lenning (Pro)	Sean Lenning / Marcos Chavez	Tyree Bastidas (Pro)	Tyree Bastidas / Billy O’Donnell
2017		Killian Carroll	Sean Lenning / Marcos Chavez	Sean Lenning (Pro)	Sean Lenning / Marcos Chavez	Timothy Gonzalez	Timothy Gonzalez / Jurell Bastidas
2018		Killian Carroll	Robbie McCarthy / Diarmaid Nash	Sean Lenning (Pro)	Daniel Cordova / Luis Cordova Jr.	Tyree Bastidas	Tyree Bastidas / Jurell Bastidas
2019		Paul Brady	Sean Lenning / Marcos Chavez	Sean Lenning (Pro)	Sean Lenning / Marcos Chavez	Timothy Gonzalez	Allan Sanchez / Victor LoPierre
2020						Tywan Cook	
2021	Killian Carroll		Sean Lenning / Nick Mattioni	Sean Lenning	Braulio Ruiz / Sam Esser	Tyree Bastidas	Tywan Cook / Victor LoPierre
2022		Diarmaid Nash	Diarmaid Nash / Martin Mulkerrins	Sean Lenning	Braulio Ruiz / Sam Esser	Tyree Bastidas (Pro)	Tyree Bastidas / Jurell Bastidas (Pro)
2023		Martin Mulkerrins	Martin Mulkerrins / Killian Carroll	Sean Lenning	Luis Cordova Jr. / Daniel Cordova	Tyree Bastidas (Pro)	Tyree Bastidas / Jurell Bastidas (Pro)
2024	Killian Carroll		Killian Carroll / Martin Mulkerrins (Pro)	Killian Carroll	Sam Esser / Braulio Ruiz	Tyree Bastidas (Pro)	Carlin Rosa / Allan Sanchez (Pro)
2025	Martin Mulkerrins		Sean Lenning / Luis Cordova Jr.	Braulio Ruiz	Sean Lenning / John A. Bike	Tyree Bastidas (Pro)	Carlin Rosa / Allan Sanchez (Pro)

== See also ==
- List of American Handball Women's Champions in the United States – women's national champions
- United States Handball Association
