= David Chapman (handballer) =

American handball player (1975–2017)

Personal information
- Nationality: United States
- Born: June 26, 1975 Long Beach, California
- Died: October 10, 2017 (aged 42) St. Louis, Missouri
- Height: 5 ft 11 in (1.80 m)

Sport
- Handedness: Right

Achievements and titles
- Highest world ranking: 1

David Chapman (June 26, 1975 – October 10, 2017) was a professional American handball player. He is known for his many pro, national, and world titles, as well as his unique style of play. He is regarded as one of the best to ever play the sport.

Chapman dominated the four-wall game for 11 years, from 1993 to 2004, winning eight United States Handball Association (USHA) national singles titles and seven national doubles titles in that period. He also won two World singles championships, and two world doubles championships during this part of his career. Throughout this period (1994-2004), Chapman was the number one ranked professional handball player in the world (except for part of 2001).

Chapman retired in 2004 but returned to the game in 2008 and played until 2012. During this period, he won two more national doubles titles, recaptured his number one ranking in 2010, and in 2011 won his ninth national four-wall singles title at the age of 35. His nine four-wall national singles titles are second only to Naty Alvarado's eleven, and his nine national four-wall doubles titles is number one of all time — achieved with three different doubles partners (Naty Alvarado Jr., Vince Munoz and Emmett Peixoto).

While Chapman's primary focus was four-wall handball, he also played in several national three-wall tournaments. Before his first retirement, Chapman won two national titles in singles and three in doubles. When he returned to handball he won another national singles title and two more national doubles titles, giving him three national singles and five national doubles titles overall in three-wall handball.

Chapman died at his home in St. Louis, Missouri, on October 10, 2017, at the age of 42.

== Early life ==
Chapman started playing when he was three years old by hitting a ball off the garage wall with his father Fred. Chapman is the only player in four-wall history to capture all five USHA national junior titles, accomplished by age sixteen. In 1985, at age ten, Chapman won the eleven-year-old national junior title, the next year, at age eleven, he won the thirteen-year-old title.

In 1987, at twelve, Chapman lost in the semifinals of the ‘Fifteens’ to fifteen-year-old John Robles, but won the 'Fifteens' the next year at age thirteen. Chapman won the ‘Seventeens’ at age fourteen, but the next year lost in the ‘Nineteens’ to Tati Silverya. Even though the sixteen-year-old Chapman had turned pro, he entered the juniors and won the nineteen-year-old title in December 1991 by beating Tyler Hamel.

In April 1991, at age fifteen, Chapman became the youngest player in professional handball history to qualify for the pro tour. In December 1991, at age sixteen, Chapman became the youngest player to become one of twelve invited players on the pro tour. To do so, Chapman beat fourth-ranked Danny Bell and fifth-ranked Vince Munoz before losing in the semifinal. He then beat the 1989 national champion Poncho Monreal to take third place in the tournament.

In June 1993, at age seventeen, Chapman won his first professional USHA national four-wall title, approximately three years younger than anyone else in the history of the game.

== Style of play ==
The dominant style of play among the pros when Chapman arrived on the scene was a fast-paced, two-handed, serve-and-shoot, power game. Under the older methods, the dominant or strong hand was primarily used for offense (as a sword), and the non-dominant or weak hand was used defensively (as a shield). Tati Silverya, Randy Morones, and Vince Munoz excelled at a totally ambidextrous, sword-and-sword style of play.

Chapman's game frequently was described as a return to traditional "percentage handball," and it also often is described as original or unconventional. Vern Roberts noted: "It’s getting to the point no one doubts Chapman. However, no one understands how he wins." Roberts goes on to offer the insightful analysis of the 16-year-old's style when he first moved into the top 12 pros:

"Wise and wily beyond his years, David forces his opponents to cover every inch of the court. Very sure hands and great anticipation allow him to keep everything but the best shots in play. With a deadly back-wall shot, David preys on any mistake from his opponents who tend to over swing whenever they get a chance to take a full cut at the ball. Back wall kills aren’t his only means of scoring, as he sticks out his hand to stop the ball in the frontcourt and lay down corner kills. It's been said he plays like a Masters-age player. The difference is he is a master at the style."

Overall, Chapman's game was organized around his great defense, but backed up by devastating first strike offense. Chapman dictated play by controlling the pace of the game, by keeping his opponents guessing and running. He played most of his shots with his dominant hand while forcing his opponent to play most of their shots with their non-dominant hand.

== Chapman vs. Brady rivalry ==
The rivalry between Dave Chapman and Paul Brady occurred in two different periods. The first period lasted from 2001 through 2004 and the second period from 2009 through 2010. Brady first qualified for the pro tour in October, 2001.

At that time, Chapman had been the best player in handball for eight years, and Brady was working his way up the rankings. From 2001 to 2004, Chapman played Brady ten times and won nine of them. In 2004, in his eighth attempt, Brady won his first and only match against Chapman, a big money match at the Seattle Showdown. Chapman had beaten Brady a few weeks earlier in the Dallas pro stop, beat him a week after Seattle in another big money match in Anchorage, and beat him in the 2004 USHA national quarterfinals, 21-9, 21-6, where Chapman went on to win his eighth national singles title, and then retired while still the number one ranked player. Brady had moved up to number two.

After nearly four years of retirement, Chapman resumed playing in 2008. By then, Brady was the number one player, had won three consecutive national titles, and would go on to win the next three. This time, Chapman was working his way up the rankings, only to lose to Brady in the finals of the USHA nationals in 2009, 21-6, 21-3 and in 2010, 21-8, 21-9; the only two times they played during Chapman's comeback. Due to injury, Brady didn't play in the nationals in 2011, and Chapman won his ninth USHA national singles title. Chapman retired for the second time early in 2012, and Brady went on to win the nationals in 2012 and 2013. Chapman won nine USHA national singles titles. Brady has won eight, and he is still active.

== Coaching ==
David Chapman ran a large camp in the summer in Colorado and Elite camps in Las Vegas in December every year.

== Record in major tournaments ==
USHA Nationals — Four Wall Singles (Pro division)

Year	Result	Final opponent	Scores
1991	Round of 16	John Bike	5-21, 5-21
1992	Quarterfinals	John Bike	11-21, 7-21
1993	First	Randy Morones	21-8, 21-11
1994	Second	Tati Silverya	21-20, 10-21, 6-11
1995	First	Tati Silverya	21-11, 21-8
1996	First	John Bike	11-21, 21-15, 11-8
1997	Quarterfinals	Randy Morones	14-21, 21-8, 3-11
1998	First	Tati Silverya	21-20, 9-21, 11-8
1999	First	Vince Munoz	21-9, Inj. Default
2000	First	Vince Munoz	21-8, 21-4
2001	Second	Vince Munoz	21-6, 3-21, 1-11
2002	First	Vince Munoz	21-11, 21-13
2003	Semifinals	Tony Healy	15-21, 21-4, 11-4
2004	First	Naty Alvarado Jr.	21-7, 11-21, 11-4
2008	Quarterfinals	Tony Healy	15-21, 15-21
2009	Second	Paul Brady	6-21, 3-21
2010	Second	Paul Brady	8-21, 9-21
2011	First	Sean Lenning	21-20, 21-13

USHA Nationals — Four-Wall Doubles

Year	Partner	Result	Final opponents	Scores
1991	Charlie Kalil	Quarterfinals	Eric Klarman/Rod Pagello	17-21, 21-13, 7-11
1992	Naty Alvarado Jr.	First	Doug Glatt/Rod Prince	21-16, 21-12
1993	Naty Alvarado Jr.	First	John Bike/John Robles	21-20, 16-21, 11-6
1994	Naty Alvarado Jr.	Second	Tati Silverya/John Bike	19-21, 10-21
1995	Naty Alvarado Jr.	First	Vince Munoz/Randy Morones	11-21, 21-18, 11-3
1996	Naty Alvarado Jr.	Second	Tati Silverya/John Bike	15-21, 7-21
1997	Bill Peoples	Second	Tati Silverya/John Bike	5-21, 10-21
1998	Vince Munoz	First	John Bike/Naty Alvarado Jr.	21-5, 21-8
1999	Vince Munoz	First	John Bike/Naty Alvarado Jr.	21-13, 21-19
2000	Vince Munoz	First	John Bike/Naty Alvarado Jr.	21-14, 21-13
2001	Vince Munoz	Second	John Bike/Naty Alvarado Jr.	13-21, 16-21
2002	Vince Munoz	First	John Bike/Naty Alvarado Jr.	21-14, 21-3
2008	Emmett Peixoto	First	Tyler Hamel/Alan Garner	21-12, 21-14
2009	Emmett Peixoto	First	Sean Lenning/Luis Moreno	21-6, 21-18
2011	Emmett Peixoto	Second	Sean Lenning/Armando Ortiz	16-21, 17-21

World Championships — Singles

Year	Result	Final Opponent	Scores
1994	First	Michael 'Duxie' Walsh	21-10, 21-8
1997	Second	John Bike	19-21, 14-21
2000	First	John Bike	21-3, 21-4
2009	Quarterfinals	Alan Garner	17-21, 18-21

World Championships — Doubles

Year	Partner	Result	Final opponents	Scores
1997	John Bike	First	Danny Bell/Merv Deckert	21-13, 21-5
2000	Danny Bell	First	John Bike/Kendall Lewis	21-8, 21-13
