= Albert Apuzzi =

American handball player

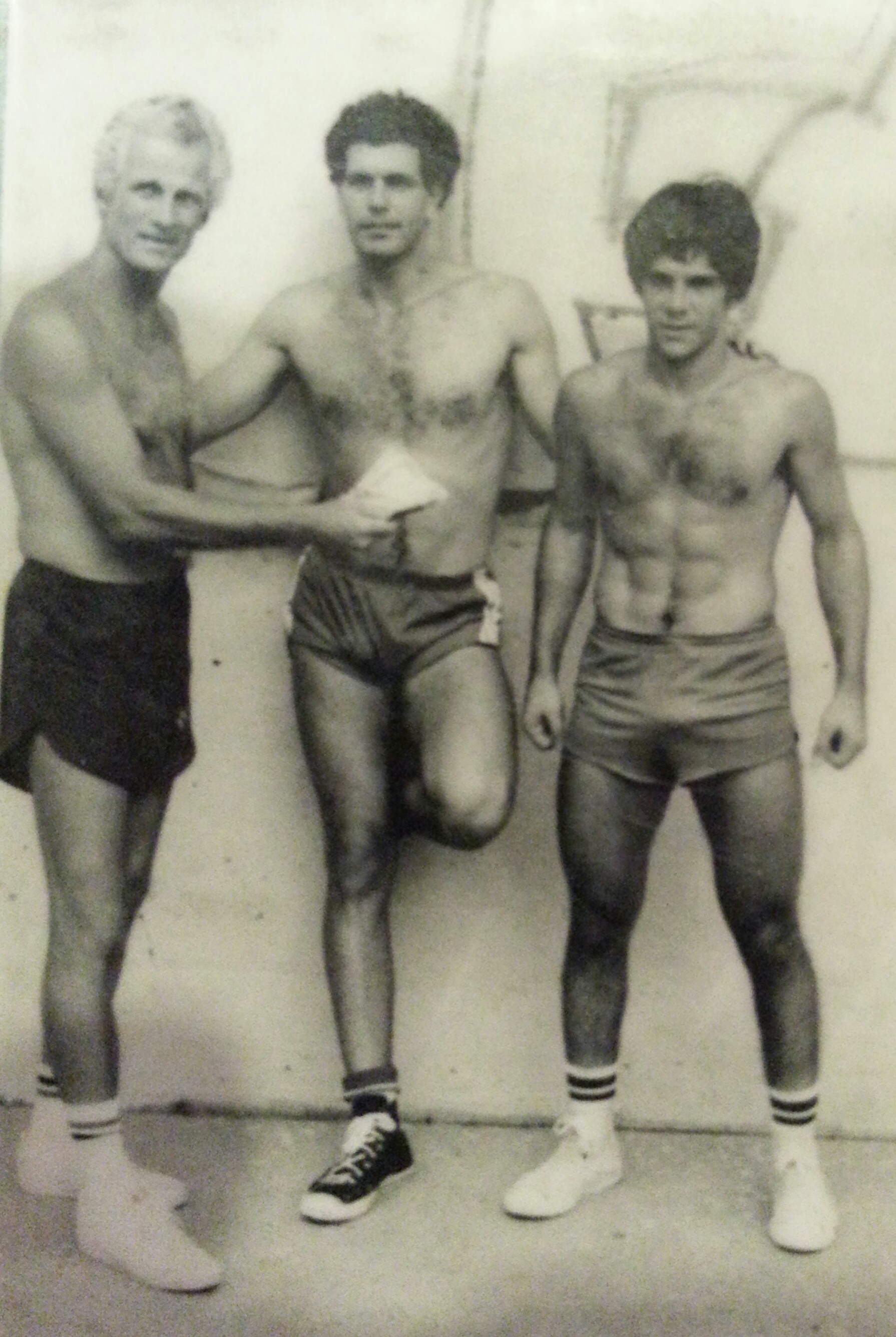
- Ruby Obert, Joe Durso and Albert Apuzzi

Personal information
- Born: United States

Sport
- Sport: Handball

Albert Apuzzi is a pharmacist and one-wall handball player notable for being a champion at the sport. His seven consecutive "Outdoor" USHA National doubles championships made him a USHA record holder. His play was noted for power, speed and stamina. He won two national singles titles before a career ending arm ailment robbed him of prime years in singles play. He has helped run many tournaments and has been described as a "goodwill ambassador" for the sport.

From 1983 to 1989, Albert Apuzzi dominated the one-wall doubles, emerging victorious each time. His handball partner was Joe Durso except in 1985, when his partner was Al Torres. Albert also won in 1992 with Ed Golden.

Apuzzi won "Outdoor" USHA National championships in one-wall singles handball in 1986 and in 1993. In addition he has won the "Indoor" USHA National 1-wall singles (1987) & doubles (1985) as well as 9 YMCA 1-wall, singles (1989 & 1995) & doubles (1989, 1993–1996, 2002 & 2004), titles.

Albert Apuzzi has a total of 21 National titles. He has been in 32 National finals. That is more than any other player. Exceeding Joe Durso's 31 & Oscar Obert's 30. Albert received his USHA Handball Hall of Fame plaque & jacket at the ICHA Awards Dinner during October 2011.
