= Obert =

Obert may refer to the following people:

== Given name ==
- Obert Bika (born 1993), Papua New Guinean football midfielder
- Obert Logan (1941–2003), American football safety
- Obert Mpofu, Zimbabwean politician
- Obert A. Olson (1882–1938), American public servant and politician
- Obert Skye (born 1970), American children's writer
- Obert C. Tanner (1904–1993), American businessman
- Obert C. Teigen (1908–1978), American attorney

== Surname ==
- Alex Obert (born 1991), American water polo player
- Igor Obert (born 1982), Slovak football defender
- Jozef Obert (1938–2020), Slovak football striker
- Michael Obert (born 1966), German book author and journalist
- Oscar Obert (1931–2016), American handball player
