= Court handball =

Court handball may refer to:

- Indoor handball
- Gaelic handball
- American handball
