= Ross Newhan =

American sports writer (1937–2026)

- Newhan c. 2000
- Born: April 5, 1937
- Died: October 25, 2026 (aged 89)
- Occupation: Sportswriter
- Employer(s): Los Angeles Times, Long Beach Press-Telegram
- Awards: J. G. Taylor Spink Award

Ross Newhan (April 5, 1937 – October 25, 2026) was an American sports writer, best known as a columnist for the Long Beach Press-Telegram and baseball writer for the Los Angeles Times. He began his career in 1961 and retired in 2004.

== Life and career ==
Newhan began his career with the Long Beach Press-Telegram in 1961 covering the Los Angeles Angels, a position he held for six years. In 1967, he joined the Los Angeles Times as the paper's traveling beat writer, covering both the Angels and Los Angeles Dodgers.

He was promoted to the Times' national baseball columnist in 1985, where he produced three or four columns a week on baseball. A members of the Baseball Writers' Association of America (BBWAA), Newhan was a voter for the National Baseball Hall of Fame for many years; at the time of his death, he was the lomgest-tenured active member of the BBWAA.

== Awards and honors ==
Newhan garnered the 1997 Associated Press Sports Editors Award for his story on the sale of the Los Angeles Dodgers. In 1998, he was inducted into the Southern California Jewish Sports Hall of Fame. Newhan was the 2000 recipient of the J. G. Taylor Spink Award, given annually by the Baseball Writers' Association of America (BBWAA). He co-authored the book Coaching Baseball Successfully.

== Personal life and death ==
Newhan was married to Constance "Connie" Fisher. His son, David Newhan, is a former Major League Baseball player and coach.

Ross Newhan died on October 25, 2026, at the age of 89 from a "cardiac event".
