= John "Rookie" Wright =

American handball player

- Born: John Wright; March 19, 1973 (age 53); New York, New York
- Height: 6 ft 1 in (185 cm)

John "Rookie" Wright is the number-one ranked one-wall handball player from New York City.

John "Rookie" Wright is the current world champion one-wall handball and winner of the first USHA National Big Ball Championship (2008). Rookie also went on to become the 2-time Skybounce championship winner, 7-time King of the Courts winner, 3-time USHA Big Blue Nationals champion, along with many other various championships. Rookie was a member of team USA winning the One Wall Federation Cup in 2008 and 2009.

He surprised the small ball handball community by winning the 2001 ICHA Mayor's Cup singles championship. Followed up with a doubles championship and a close semifinal loss in the singles, at the 2001 USHA Nationals. In the years ahead his attempts to take another small ball title did not materialise. In doubles, he made it to the finals in 2003, 2004 and 2005 and lost in the semi-finals in 2002 and 2009. In singles, he made it to the finals in 2004 and to the semi-finals in 2001, 2006 and 2007. John cemented his legendary "Goat" (in the context of "Greatest of all time") status in the handball world in 2013 and 2016 by winning an unprecedented sixth and seventh King Of The Courts title at the age of 40 and 43. During his prime playing days, John was considered a formidable opponent by other players.
