= Max Wosniak =

Polish-American soccer player and coach (1926–2023)

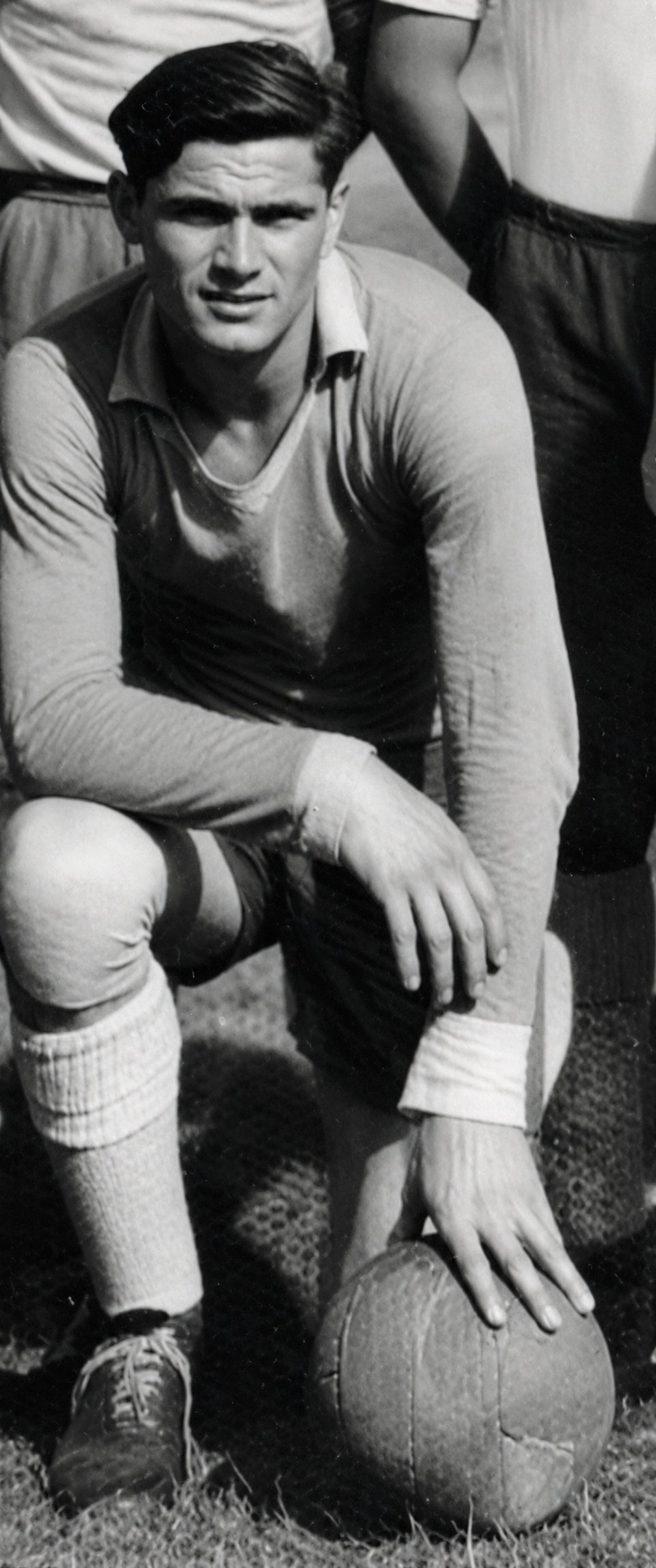
- Wosniak in 1956

Personal information
- Date of birth: September 22, 1926
- Place of birth: Cologne, Germany
- Date of death: July 7, 2023 (aged 96)
- Place of death: Encino, California, U.S.
- Position: Goalkeeper

Senior career*
Years	Team	Apps	(Gls)
1946-1952	Victoria Świebodzice		
1952-1956	Górnik Wałbrzych		
1956	Maccabi Jaffa		
1957-1959	Hapoel Kfar Saba		

International career
	Israel	1	(-)

Managerial career
- 1967-?: Los Angeles Toros
- ?-1973: Maccabee Los Angeles
- 1973: United States
- * Club domestic league appearances and goals

Max Wozniak (September 22, 1926 – July 7, 2023) was a German-born Polish-American soccer goalkeeper and coach who was briefly head coach of the United States men's national soccer team.

== Biography ==
Max Wozniak was born in Cologne, on September 22, 1926.

Wozniak played in Victoria Świebodzice (1946–1952), Górnik Wałbrzych (1952–1956), Maccabi Jaffa (1956), Hapoel Kfar Saba (1957–1959) and one match in Israel national team.

In 1967, he coached the Los Angeles Toros of the National Professional Soccer League. After leading Maccabee Los Angeles to victory in the 1973 National Challenge Cup, Wozniak became head coach of the U.S. national team. He was in charge for two games, losing both. Future national team head coach Walter Chyzowych was his assistant.

In 1993, he was inducted into the Southern California Jewish Sports Hall of Fame.

Wozniak died in Encino, California, on July 7, 2023, at the age of 96.
