= Southern California Jewish Sports Hall of Fame =

Hall of fame in Beverly Hills, California

- Formation: January 1990; 36 years ago
- Type: Hall of Fame
- Location(s): Beverly Hills, California; American Jewish University
- Region served: United States
- Website: scjewishsportshof.org

The Southern California Jewish Sports Hall of Fame, in Beverly Hills, California, is a hall of fame dedicated to honoring American Jewish athletes, other sports personalities, and teams from Southern California who have distinguished themselves in sports.

== History ==
Inductee Sandy Koufax

The Hall of Fame was established in 1990 by a group of men and women organized by former All-America basketball player Eli Sherman. It is located in Bel Air, California, at the American Jewish University. It honors Southern California Jewish athletes, coaches, officials, media, executives, and others at both professional and non-professional levels. It also supports the Maccabiah Games in Israel, JCC Maccabi Games, and the Allan Malamud Memorial Scholarship Fund.

It has honored over 300 Jewish men, women, and teams. Inductees have included (for example) swimmers Mark Spitz and Lenny Krayzelburg, baseball Hall of Famer Sandy Koufax, all-around athlete Lillian Copeland, water polo player Merrill Moses, tennis players Brian Teacher and Stacy Margolin, and football coach Sid Gillman.

== Hall of Fame ==
=== 1990 ===
- Amy Alcott (Golf 1990)
- Sam Balter (Media 1990)
- Ron Barak (Gymnastics 1990)
- Marty Biegel (Basketball 1990)
- David Blackburn (Fastpitch Softball 1990)
- Carl Borack (Fencing 1990)
- Mitch Chortkoff (Media 1990)
- Harlan Cohen (Volleyball 1990)
- Lillian Copeland (Track & Field 1990)
- Harry Edelson (Football 1990)
- Herb Flam (Tennis 1990)
- Sam Franklin (Swimming 1990)
- Michael Franks (Tennis 1990)
- Larry Friend (Basketball 1990)
- Mitch Gaylord (Gymnastics 1990)
- Sid Gillman (Football 1990)
- Bill Harmatz (Horse Racing 1990)
- Jimmy Jacobs (Handball 1990)
- Erwin Klein (Table Tennis 1990)
- Sandy Koufax (Baseball 1990)
- Cheryl Kriegsman (Swimming 1990)
- Deborah Lipman-McCormick (Diving 1990)
- Sol H. Marshall (Maccabee Award 1990)
- Ron Mix (Football 1990)
- Dennis Needleman (Water Polo 1990)
- Shannon Orcutt (Swimming 1990)
- Jimmy Reese (Pillar of Achievement 1990)
- Leonard Reifman (Pillar of Achievement 1990)
- Murray Rosenstein (Officiating 1990)
- Roy Salter (Water Polo 1990)
- Gene Selznick (Volleyball 1990)
- Sharon Shapiro (Gymnastics 1990)
- Sidney Shapiro (Maccabee Award 1990)
- Eli Sherman (Basketball 1990)
- Joseph Siegman (Pillar of Achievement 1990)
- Frank Spellman (Weightlifting 1990)
- Mark Spitz (Swimming 1990)
- Jenny Susser (Swimming 1990)
- Valerie Zimring (Rhythmic Gymnastics 1990)

=== 1991 ===
- Alan Dolensky (Basketball 1991)
- Herman Epstein (Sports Medicine 1991)
- Michael Epstein (Baseball 1991)
- Roy Firestone (Media 1991)
- Allen Fox (Tennis 1991)
- Brian Ginsberg (Gymnastics 1991)
- Sue Gozansky (Volleyball 1991)
- Charlie Harris (Water Polo 1991)
- Jack Hirsch (Basketball 1991)
- Martin "Marty" Hogan (Racquetball 1991)
- Burt Kanner (Swimming 1991)
- Irv Kaze (Pillar of Achievement 1991)
- Allan Malamud (Media 1991)
- Steve Marcus (Track & Field 1991)
- Eli Marmur (Soccer 1991)
- Don Rosenthal (Swimming 1991)
- Marty Rubinoff (Fastpitch Softball 1991)
- Sheldon Sidlow (Maccabee Award 1991)
- Simon Singer (Handball 1991)
- Eric Sondheimer (Media 1991)

=== 1993 ===
- Steve Bisheff (Media 1993)
- Jerome Bobrow (Maccabee Award 1993)
- Phil Bruder (Fastpitch Softball 1993)
- Barry Cowan (Maccabee Award 1993)
- Al Franken (Track & Field 1993)
- Roz Goldenberg (Basketball 1993)
- Barry Goldfarb (Swimming 1993)
- Joel Kramer (Basketball 1993)
- Bruce Manson (Tennis 1993)
- Steve Miller (Basketball 1993)
- Fred Roggin (Media 1993)
- Robert Rosenfeld (Sports Medicine 1993)
- Larry Sherry (Baseball 1993)
- Howard Slavin (Officiating 1993)
- Michael Sondheimer (Media 1993)
- Lawrence Weinberg (Pillar of Achievement 1993)
- George Wikler (Gymnastics 1993)
- Stacy Winsberg (Fastpitch Softball 1993)
- Max Wozniak (Soccer 1993)

=== 1994 ===
- Barry Ackerman (Maccabee Award 1994)
- Steve Berk (Coaching 1994)
- Myron Berliner (Football 1994)
- Jerome Bornstein (Sports Medicine 1994)
- Aileen Eaton (Boxing 1994)
- Dana Gilbert (Tennis 1994)
- Art Harris (Baseball 1994)
- Arnold Klein (Gymnastics 1994)
- Jerry Nemer (Basketball 1994)
- Bernard Samuels (Officiating 1994)
- Norm Sherry (Baseball 1994)
- Leigh Steinberg (Pillar of Achievement 1994)
- Robert Steiner (Media 1994)

=== 1996 ===
- Leo Cantor (Football 1996)
- Hy Cohen (Baseball 1996)
- Harry Danning (Baseball 1996)
- Sam Feedman (Fastpitch Softball 1996)
- Jack Fields (Boxing 1996)
- Brad Gilbert (Tennis 1996)
- Seth Greenberg (Basketball 1996)
- Robert Kerlan (Sports Medicine 1996)
- Barry Latman (Baseball 1996)
- Daniel Millman (Gymnastics 1996)
- Randy Rosenbloom (Media 1996)
- Alan Rothenberg (Pillar of Achievement 1996)
- Sanford Silverman (Maccabee Award 1996)
- Susan Stevens (Tennis 1996)
- Fred Stone (Sports Artist 1996)

=== 1997 ===
- Howard Abrams (Basketball 1997)
- Harry Adelman (Football 1997)
- Ronald Botchan (Officiating 1997)
- Steve Brener (Media 1997)
- Julius Heldman (Tennis 1997)
- Alan Hoisch (Football 1997)
- Robert Karns (Sports Medicine 1997)
- Daniel Kutler (Swimming 1997)
- Vic Lapiner (Baseball 1997)
- Norman Marks (Gymnastics 1997)
- Lisa Rosenfield (Media 1997)
- Paul Soifer (Maccabee Award 1997)
- Neil Stone (Gymnastics 1997)
- Julian Wolf (Rowing 1997)

=== 1998 ===
- Steve Becker (Maccabee Award 1998)
- Stuart Blumkin (Water Sports 1998)
- David Epstein (Track and Field 1998)
- Zvi Friedman (Soccer 1998)
- Joel Gershon (Football 1998)
- Dennis Gilbert (Sports Agent 1998)
- Daniel Goodman (Media 1998)
- Monty Hall (Pillar of Achievement 1998)
- Hal Lambert (Football 1998)
- Maccabee Los Angeles Soccer Team (Soccer 1998)
- Ross Newhan (Media 1998)
- Paul C. Raphael (Table Tennis 1998)
- Ray Rosenbaum (Media 1998)
- Michelle Steinberger (Swimming 1998)
- Eliot Teltscher (Tennis 1998)
- Sanford L. Werner (Gymnastics 1998)

=== 2000 ===
- Phyllis Adler-Kadner (Masters Tennis 2000)
- Barry Asher (Bowling 2000)
- Paris Blumenthal (Karate 2000)
- Mel Durslag (Media 2000)
- Mark Heisler (Media 2000)
- Sydney Kronenthal (Pillar of Achievement 2000)
- Howard Levine (Basketball 2000)
- Sammy Match (Tennis 2000)
- Milken Family Foundation (Pillar of Achievement 2000)
- Dorian "Doc" Paskowitz (Surfing 2000)
- Harold Ross "Lefty" Phillips (Baseball 2000)
- Cary Alan Ross (Track & Field 2000)
- Paul Ziffren (Pillar of Achievement 2000)

=== 2001 ===
- Carol Altschiller-Heiser (Golf 2001)
- Andrew Bernstein (Media 2001)
- Robert Breitbard (Pillar of Achievement 2001)
- Martin Denkin (Boxing 2001)
- Alan Epstein (Media 2001)
- Shawn Green (Baseball 2001)
- Eugene V. Klein (Pillar of Achievement 2001)
- Lenny Krayzelburg (Swimming 2001)
- Richard Levin (Media 2001)
- Deborah Mink (Gymnastics 2001)
- Ephraim Moxson (Media 2001)
- Robert Masters Myman (Water Polo 2001)
- Milt Nemiroff (Tennis 2001)
- Harry Ornest (Pillar of Achievement 2001)
- Ron Rapoport (Media 2001)
- Beth Silverman (Kaminkow) (Softball 2001)

=== 2003 ===
- Robert Arum (Boxing 2003)
- Richard Brown (Pillar of Achievement 2003)
- Al Davis (Football 2003)
- Deena Drossin (Track & Field 2003)
- Jack Epstein (Football 2003)
- Anthony Ervin (Swimming 2003)
- Bruce Gardner (Baseball 2003)
- Justin Gimelstob (Tennis 2003)
- Benny Goldberg (Boxing 2003)
- Jason Lezak (Swimming 2003)
- Norman Meyers (Bowling 2003)
- Mel North (Fencing 2003)
- Giora Payes (Tennis 2003)
- Bert Schneider (Football 2003)
- Mathieu Schneider (Ice Hockey 2003)
- Sam Schulman (Pillar of Achievement 2003)
- Albert Silvera (Baseball 2003)
- Steve Springer (Media 2003)
- Bill Wold (Basketball 2003)

=== 2004 ===
- Sheldon Andrens (Baseball 2004)
- Anne Barber (Lawn Bowling 2004)
- Bill Caplan (Boxing 2004)
- Stan Cline (Sports Artist 2004)
- Marc Dellins (Media 2004)
- Carl Earn (Tennis 2004)
- Leland Faust (Water Polo 2004)
- Bobby Frankel (Horse Racing 2004)
- Derrick Hall (Media 2004)
- Sol Hauptman (Paddle Tennis 2004)
- Bill Libby (Pillar of Achievement 2004)
- Barry Lorge (Media 2004)
- Stacy Margolin (Tennis 2004)
- Ira Pauly (Football 2004)
- Richard Perelman (Track & Field 2004)
- Dana and David Pump (Pillar of Achievement 2004)
- Ken Schwartz (Fastpitch Softball 2004)
- Jerry Simon (Basketball 2004)
- Dara Torres (Swimming 2004)

=== 2006 ===
- Robert Barnes (Sports Medicine 2006)
- David Bluthenthal (Basketball 2006)
- Cindy Bortz-Gould (Skating 2006)
- Nick Bravin (Fencing 2006)
- Hal Charnofsky (Baseball 2006)
- Stan Charnofsky (Baseball 2006)
- Thelma "Tiby" Eisen (Baseball 2006)
- Max Gold (Handball 2006)
- Merton Isaacman (Lawn Bowling 2006)
- Gabe Kapler (Baseball 2006)
- Jim Rome (Media 2006)
- Joel Rubenstein (Pillar of Achievement 2006)
- Donald Sterling (Basketball 2006)
- Brian Teacher (Tennis 2006)
- Rachel Wacholder (Volleyball 2006)
- Lawrence Wein (Football 2006)
- Vicki Wolf (Pillar of Achievement 2006)

=== 2008 ===
- Jonathan Bornstein (Soccer 2008)
- Glenn Cowan (Table Tennis 2008)
- Darryl Dunn (Pillar of Achievement 2008)
- Jerry Feldman (Baseball 2008)
- Shaney Fink (Volleyball 2008)
- Perry Klein (Football 2008)
- Kathy Kohner-Zuckerman (Surfing 2008)
- Bob Marks (Pillar of Achievement 2008)
- Ron Price (Football 2008)
- Craig Steinberg (Golf 2008)
- Arn Tellem (Sports Agent 2008)
- Westside Volleyball Team 1960-65 (Volleyball 2008)
- Wallace Wolf (Water Sports 2008)

=== 2010 ===
- Ryan Braun (Baseball 2010)
- Scott Drootin (Baseball 2010)
- Jordan Farmar (Basketball 2010)
- Benny Feilhaber (Soccer 2010)
- Steve Hartman (Media 2010)
- Harold Hecht (Media 2010)
- Jillian Kraus (Water Polo 2010)
- Louise Lieberman (Soccer 2010)
- Joel Meyers (Media 2010)
- Aaron Rosenberg (Football 2010)
- Jeff Shell (Media 2010)
- Michelle Silver (Tenpin Bowling 2010)
- Steve Soboroff (Pillar of Achievement 2010)

=== 2011 ===
- Joe Axelrad (Water Polo 2011)
- Sam Bailey (Water Polo 2011)
- Marc Bluestone (Basketball 2011)
- Richard "Dick" Conger (Baseball 2011)
- Mike Enfield (Soccer 2011)
- Philip Erenberg (Gymnastics 2011)
- Doug Gottlieb (Basketball 2011)
- Vic "The Brick" Jacobs (Media 2011)
- Shawn Lipman (Rugby 2011)
- Taylor Mays (Football 2011)
- Taylor Mazaroff (Racquetball 2011)
- Ann and Jerry Moss (Pillar of Achievement 2011)
- Jay Privman (Media 2011)

=== 2014 ===
- Larry Beinfest (Baseball 2014)
- Mel Bleeker (Football 2014)
- Judy Blumberg (Figure Skating 2014)
- Izzy Cantor (Football 2014)
- Mitch Fenton (Lacrosse 2014)
- Paul Haber (Handball 2014)
- Bernie Holtzman (Volleyball 2014)
- Anita Kanter (Tennis 2014)
- Mel Keefer (Media 2014)
- Stuart Krohn (Rugby 2014)
- Norm Miller (Baseball 2014)
- Steve Stovitz (Volleyball 2014)
- Shaun Tomson (Surfing 2014)
- Rosalind Wyman (Pillar of Achievement 2014)
- Toby Zwikel (Media 2014)

=== 2015 ===
- Barbara Breit (Tennis 2015)
- Sasha Cohen (Figure Skating 2015)
- Helene Elliott (Media 2015)
- Amanda Fink (Tennis 2015)
- Scott Freedman (Paddle Tennis 2015)
- Ted Leitner (Media 2015)
- Thea Lemberger (Basketball 2015)
- Camille Levin (Soccer 2015)
- Mike Lieberthal (Baseball 2015)
- Erik Lorig (Football 2015)
- Merrill Moses (Water Polo 2015)
- Art Sherman (Horse Racing 2015)
- Alla Svirsky (Gymnastics 2015)
- Dani Yudin (Fastpitch Softball 2015)
- Howard Zuckerman (Pillar of Achievement 2015)

=== 2016 ===
- Erik Affholter (Football 2016)
- Andy Bailey (Water Polo 2016)
- Glenn Diamond (Media 2016)
- Ashley Grossman (Water Polo 2016)
- Andy Hill (Basketball 2016)
- Steve Kuechel (Tennis 2016)
- Andrew Lorraine (Baseball 2016)
- Andi Murez (Swimming 2016)
- Geoff Schwartz (Football 2016)
- Mitchell Schwartz (Football 2016)
- Ramona Shelburne (Softball 2016)
- Marc Stein (Media 2016)
- Stanley Tarshis (Gymnastics 2016)
- Jerry Weinstein (Pillar of Achievement 2016)

=== 2018 ===
- Nancy Cohen-Fredgant (Volleyball 2018)
- Myra Einberg (Golf 2018)
- Burt Fuller (Volleyball 2018)
- Bob Gottlieb (Basketball 2018)
- Lee Jenkins (Media 2018)
- Stan Kasten (Pillar of Achievement 2018)
- Savannah Levin (Soccer 2018)
- Kevin Pillar (Baseball 2018)
- Henry & Susan Samueli (Pillar of Achievement 2018)
- Josh Samuels (Water Polo 2018)
- Mike Seidman (Football 2018)
- Samantha Shapiro (Gymnastics 2018)
- Jeff Siegel (Horse Racing 2018)
- Daniel Steres (Soccer 2018)
- Bob Zelinka (Football 2018)

=== 2020 ===
- Steven Birnbaum (Soccer 2020)
- Cody Decker (Baseball 2020)
- Jamie Fink (Soccer 2020)
- Chelsey Goldberg (Ice Hockey 2020)
- Ryan Lavarnway (Baseball 2020)
- Bob Lyons (Coaching & Administration 2020)
- Joc Pederson (Baseball 2020)
- Judy Shapiro-Ikenberry (Track & Field 2020)
- Zoe Shaw (Softball 2020)
- Debbie Spander (Sports Agent 2020)
- Soren Thompson (Fencing 2020)

=== 2022 ===
- Max Fried (Baseball 2022)
- Josh Satin (Baseball 2022)
- Daisy Feder (Basketball 2022)
- Bud Kling (Coaching/Admin 2022)
- Todd Wolfson (Coaching/Admin 2022)
- Jennifer Horowitz (Fencing 2022)
- Ben Rosin (Football 2022)
- Max Homa (Golf 2022)
- Donna Turnbow (Gymnastics 2022)
- David Cohen (Horse Racing 2022)
- Arielle Ship (Soccer 2022)
- Cara Blumfield (Softball 2022)
- Bill Shaikin (Sports Media 2022)
- Rebecca Mehra (Track & Field 2022)
- Gabrielle Domanic-Fernandez (Water Polo 2022)
- Lee Zeidman (Pillar of Achievement 2022)
- Eli Sherman (Pillar of Achievement 2022)

=== 2023-2024 ===
- Jason Hirsh (Baseball)
- Jon Palarz (Basketball)
- David Lertzman (Coaching)
- Olivia Rosendahl (Diving)
- Hayden Epstein (Football)
- Josh Rosen (Football)
- Brett Sterling (Hockey)
- Jodi Borenstein (Softball)
- Josh Rawitch (Media)
- Ted Sobel (Media)
- Aurelia Nattiv (Sports Medicine)
- Larry Nagler (Tennis)
- Dwight Stones (Track & Field)
- Ross Sinclair (Water Polo)
- Michael Roth (Pillar of Achievement)
- Michael Schulman (Pillar of Achievement)

=== 2025 ===
- Marshal Salomon (Bike 2025)

== See also ==
- List of Jews in sports
- Jewish Sports Review
- National Jewish Museum Sports Hall of Fame (U.S.)
- International Jewish Sports Hall of Fame
