= David Newhan =

American baseball player & coach (born 1973)

- Utility player
- Born: September 7, 1973 (age 53); Fullerton, California, U.S.
- Batted: Left Threw: Right

MLB debut
- June 4, 1999, for the San Diego Padres

Last MLB appearance
- September 28, 2008, for the Houston Astros

MLB statistics
- Batting average: .253
- Home runs: 23
- Runs batted in: 120
- Stats at Baseball Reference

Teams
- San Diego Padres (1999–2000); Philadelphia Phillies (2000–2001); Baltimore Orioles (2004–2006); New York Mets (2007); Houston Astros (2008)

David Matthew Newhan (born September 7, 1973) is an American former professional baseball utility player who played in Major League Baseball (MLB) for five teams during eight seasons. He batted left-handed and threw right-handed.

After serving three seasons as the hitting coach for the Minor League Baseball (MiLB) Lake Elsinore Storm, Newhan was named by the Oakland Athletics to manage its MiLB affiliate, the Vermont Lake Monsters, for the 2014 season. He is currently a MiLB infield coordinator for the Los Angeles Angels after previously serving as the assistant hitting coach for the Detroit Tigers for two seasons.

== Early life ==
Newhan's father is Ross Newhan, a baseball writer who received the J. G. Taylor Spink Award in 2000 from the Baseball Writers' Association of America and was honored during 2001 ceremonies at the National Baseball Hall of Fame. The elder Newhan spent 44 years as a sportswriter in the Los Angeles area, first for the Long Beach Press-Telegram and then for the Los Angeles Times, covering the Angels, the Dodgers, and the national baseball scene until his retirement in 2004.

David Newhan was an infielder at Esperanza High School in Anaheim, California. At Esparanza, he was teammate on the school's baseball team with Keith McDonald. He starred in high school, but only received scholarship offers at the Division II level.

== College ==
Newhan attended Cypress College, a junior college, in 1992. His coach experimented by putting Newhan at first base. To prepare him, the coach had Newhan put on catcher's gear and then hit grounders at Newhan. Eventually, Newhan played the position the entire year.

After a season at Cypress, Newhan was recruited to play second base alongside star shortstop Nomar Garciaparra at Georgia Tech in 1993. Head coach Jim Morris had lied to him about the position, however, and he ended up playing first base. He therefore transferred to Pepperdine University the following year. At Pepperdine, he hit .313 with 15 home runs and 71 RBIs in 103 games in 1994 and 1995. He was All-West Coast Conference as a left fielder in 1995, after leading the league in slugging and home runs. He graduated from Pepperdine in 1995 with a business administration degree.

In 1993 and 1994, he played collegiate summer baseball in the Cape Cod Baseball League for the Yarmouth-Dennis Red Sox.

== Minor leagues ==
Newhan was drafted by the Oakland Athletics as an outfielder in the 17th round of the 1995 amateur draft. He was primarily considered an outfielder until his second pro season in 1996. Newhan hit .301 that season with a .538 slugging percentage, 25 home runs, and 17 stolen bases in 117 games.

In three years in the Athletics' minor league system, Newhan never made his way higher than Oakland's Single-A team, and despite signs of improvement, was traded with Don Wengert to the San Diego Padres organization for Jorge Velandia and Doug Bochtler in November 1997. Newhan batted .277 over two seasons with San Diego's Double-A team. He was promoted to the Padres' Triple-A team before the 1999 season where over 98 games he batted .286 with 22 stolen bases.

Through 2008, his minor league batting line was .290/.369/.464, with 109 home runs in 3,331 at bats. The Philadelphia Phillies added Newhan to their triple-A Lehigh Valley IronPigs team as a player-coach in April 2009, and he hit .275 while playing first base, second base, shortstop, third base, and the outfield.

== Major leagues ==
=== Early career ===
Newhan made his Major League debut with the Padres in 1999. He began the 2000 season as the second baseman for the Padres, but hit for a batting average of only .150 and was soon demoted to Triple-A. While in the minors, he was traded to the Philadelphia Phillies for Desi Relaford. The Phillies briefly kept him at Triple-A before calling him up to the major leagues. In the off-season, Newhan was traded to his previous club, the Padres, who then traded him back to the Phillies before the 2001 season. During the 2001 season, Newhan appeared in seven games for the Phillies before injuring his shoulder making a play in the outfield. "I ran into a wall, and it didn't move", he said. He had season-ending shoulder surgery to repair a torn labrum on May 25. In October, he was released by the Phillies.

Newhan was signed by the Los Angeles Dodgers in February 2002 and released in October. He signed with the Colorado Rockies in May 2003 and played in their minor league system, hitting .348 with a .392 on-base percentage in Triple-A. He became a free agent after the season. He then signed with the Texas Rangers. His contract included a clause requiring the Rangers to release him by June 15, 2004, if he were not on the Major League team. He was not promoted and subsequently earned his release.

=== Baltimore Orioles (2004–06) ===
The Baltimore Orioles signed Newhan in June 2004. He was hitting .328, with a .557 slugging percentage and 10 stolen bases in 10 attempts in Triple-A when the Orioles called him up. In 2004 with the Orioles, he had 42 hits through 100 at bats, and if not for a pinch hit appearance in which he flied out, he would have had a 21-game hit streak. He finished with a .311 batting average, seven triples (seventh in the AL), eight home runs, 54 RBIs, and 11 stolen bases in 12 attempts. He hit .343 with runners in scoring position and .400 with runners in scoring position and two out. One of his more exciting hits was an inside-the-park home run off Pedro Martínez with a runner on base on a drive off the center field wall on July 21 against the Boston Red Sox at Fenway Park. On the play Red Sox left fielder Manny Ramirez cut off a relay throw by center fielder Johnny Damon.

2005 was a disappointment for Newhan. Because there were so many "everyday" starters on the Orioles, Newhan was relegated to the bench. He saw very limited action and struggled at the plate. Rarely playing on consecutive days, he claimed it was impossible to be consistent offensively. He was briefly demoted to Triple-A, where he hit .366. During spring training for the 2006 season, he batted .400. While the Orioles had planned to use him as a backup, they started him in seven of their first ten games due to his spring stats. He had seven runs, two home runs, and three stolen bases. On his third stolen base, he slid awkwardly and had to leave the game with a broken right fibula on April 17. Newhan was placed on the disabled list and was out until the end of August. He finished the season with a .252 average and four home runs.

=== New York Mets (2007) ===
Newhan signed as a free agent a one-year, $575,000 contract with the New York Mets on January 5, 2007, turning down an offer from the Chicago Cubs. Newhan was used mainly as a pinch hitter by the Mets for much of April and early May, but was given a great deal of playing time after that due to a slew of injuries that landed several Mets starters on the disabled list. Newhan hit .200, driving in only four runs (including a solo home run) with the Mets, as he played left field and second base. On June 8, the Mets optioned Newhan to the New Orleans Zephyrs. In July, the Mets recalled Newhan from the Zephyrs, sent him down, and recalled him once again. In 108 at bats with the Triple-A team through the end of July, he batted .358/.405/.569. Newhan was sent to Triple-A New Orleans after the season, but declined the assignment, making him a free agent.

=== Houston Astros (2008) ===
On January 29, 2008, Newhan signed a minor league deal with the Houston Astros, who invited him to spring training. Newhan split the season between the Triple-A Round Rock Express, where he hit .308 .with a .535 slugging percentage, and the Astros, where he batted .260 in 64 games (and .408 in games that were late and close), primarily at second base.

On January 29, 2009, Newhan re-signed as a non-roster free agent with the Astros, who invited him to spring training. He did not make the team out of spring training, and on March 29, Newhan was released. On July 23, 2009, Newhan was signed by the Philadelphia Phillies organization, where he spent the rest of the year in Triple-A.

=== San Diego Padres (2011) ===
Newhan signed a minor league contract for the 2011 season with the San Diego Padres, receiving an invitation to spring training. He did not make the regular season roster.

== Coaching career ==
On November 10, 2014, the Tigers announced the hiring of Newhan as an assistant hitting coach. He remained in that position through the 2016 season and was replaced by Leon "Bull" Durham on October 21, 2016.

On December 1, 2016, Newhan was hired by the Los Angeles Angels as a minor league infield coordinator. He served as manager for the Double-A Mobile BayBears in 2019. In 2020, Newhan became the hitting coach for the Altoona Curve, the Pirates Double-A affiliate.

== Playing style ==
Newhan's swing was compact and level, mostly generating line drives and groundballs. He batted from every position in the batting order, but mostly batted second through 2008. Newhan played all infield positions, except shortstop, as well as all outfield positions. Through 2008, he had played four games at first base, 57 games at second base, 29 games at third base, and over 300 games split among the three outfield positions. His range was average both in the infield and outfield, and he threw accurately.

== Personal life ==
Nicknamed "Son of Scribe", because his father, Ross, is a long-time baseball writer for the Los Angeles Times, Newhan was a solid student while growing up in California and later at Pepperdine, but he never considered following in his father's journalistic footsteps. "Playing seemed a lot more fun than writing", he says. "My dad writes at home, and one thing I've seen a lot of is his cussing up a storm, yelling at the laptop. I understand what the sportswriter goes through. I don't think anyone has to worry about me pulling an Albert Belle."

Newhan is a member of the Pepperdine Waves Hall of Fame. He was born Jewish and raised as a Conservative Jew but converted to Christianity in 1999 and now considers himself a Messianic Jew. He injured his cervical vertebra 2, a potentially life-threatening injury, during a surfing incident in 2009.
