= Ira Pauly =

American psychiatrist

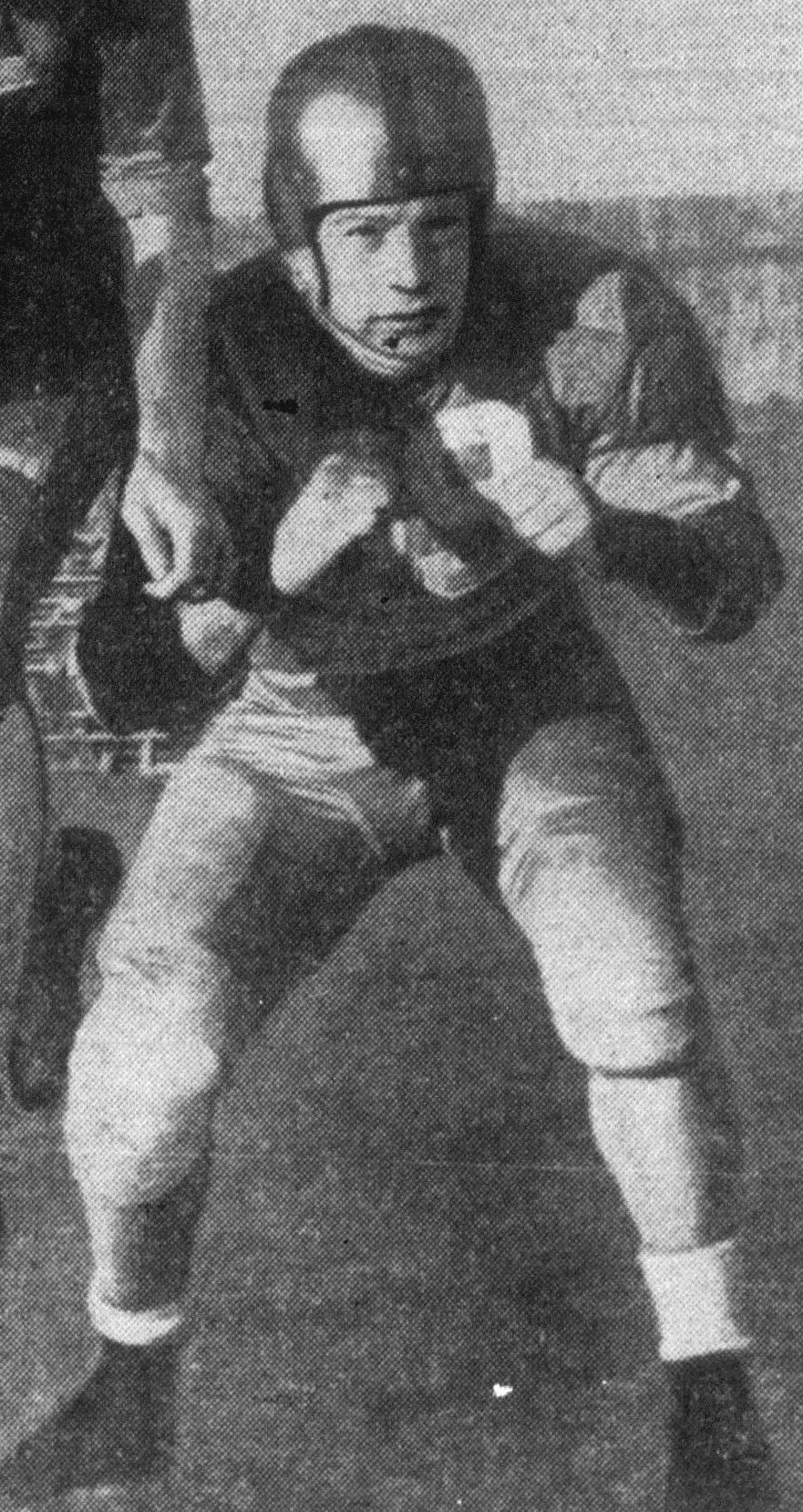
Pauly as a member of the UCLA Bruins football team in 1953.

Ira Basil Pauly (born November 15, 1930) is an American psychiatrist who was an All American college football player at UCLA, and is known for his influential work on transsexualism.

== Early life ==
Pauly attended grammar school in Beverly Hills, California, and then Beverly Hills High School.

He then earned his undergraduate degree with honors from the University of California, Los Angeles, in 1954, where he belonged to the fraternity Tau Epsilon Phi (TEP). There he was a standout football for the UCLA Bruins football team and rugby player. He won the Bruins' 1952 most improved player trophy and 1953 Spirit and Scholarship Award and was named a First Team Academic All-American in 1953. in 1953. That season, UCLA won the Pacific Coast Conference and played in the Rose Bowl, during which he started both ways, as center and linebacker. As to his mother's reaction to him playing football, he said: "My mother wasn’t that crazy about it, though she never forbade me. In those days, the Jewish son was supposed to be a doctor, not a football player."

He was selected as the 1953 Los Angeles Jewish Collegiate Athlete of the Year by B'nai B'rith. In 2004, Pauly was inducted into the Southern California Jewish Sports Hall of Fame.

He graduated from UCLA Medical School in 1958, and did his internship there.

== Career ==
In the 1960s, while on the faculty at University of Oregon Medical School, Pauly began writing and speaking about the treatment of transsexualism. He became supportive of sex reassignment surgery in 1961 "after soul-searching deliberation." Pauly noted that both transsexualism and abortion were "sex and tabooed topics" that elicited strong responses. Pauly is credited for undertaking the first global review of the published outcome data on transsexualism in 1965.

Also in the mid-1960s, he began collaborating with endocrinologist Harry Benjamin, who cited Pauly's work in The Transsexual Phenomenon. The two later worked to popularize their research in the lay press. In 1975, Pauly and University of Oregon medical student Thomas W. Lindgren introduced the Body Image Scale, with which subjects rate feelings about 30 body parts from 1 (very satisfied) to 5 (very dissatisfied). His 1981 follow-up report on outcome data was later published with independent reviews by Bengt Lundström and Jan Wålinder in 1984. Pauly was president of the Harry Benjamin International Gender Dysphoria Association, now known as the World Professional Association for Transgender Health, from 1985 to 1987.

Pauly left Oregon for an appointment as professor and chairman at the Department of Psychiatry and Behavioral Sciences, University of Nevada School of Medicine in Reno, Nev. Under his leadership, the Department of Psychiatry developed a fully accredited residency. He retired from the medical school in 1994.

Pauly also served on the American Psychiatric Association's Subcommittee on Gender Identity Disorders. He continued to practice clinically until 2010.

== Personal life ==
He married Ann Flanagan in 1960. He has four sons, Brett, Quinn, Devin, and Tye, and seven grandchildren.

== Selected publications ==
- Pauly IB (1965). Male psychosexual inversion: Transsexualism: A review of 100 cases. Arch Gen Psychiatry. 1965 Aug;13:172-81.
- Pauly IB (1968). The current status of the change of sex operation. J Nerv Ment Dis, Nov;147(5):460-71.
- Pauly IB (1974). Female transsexualism: Part I. Archives of Sexual Behavior 3: 487-507
- Pauly IB (1974). Female Transsexualism: Part II. Archives of Sexual Behavior 3 (6): 509-26.
- Lindgren TW, Pauly IB (1975). A body image scale for evaluating transsexuals. Archives of Sexual Behavior Nov; 4(6): 639-56
- Pauly IB (1981). Outcome of sex reassignment surgery for transsexuals. Aust. NZ. Jn. of Psychiatry, 15(1), 45-51.
- Lundström B, Pauly IB, Wålinder J (1984). Outcome of sex reassignment surgery. Acta Psychiatrica Scandinavica, 70, 289-94.
- Pauly IB, MT Edgerton (1986). The gender identity movement: A growing surgical-psychiatric liaison. Archives of Sexual Behavior Aug;15(4):315-29.
- Bradley SJ, Blanchard R, Coates SW, Green R, Levine SB, Meyer-Bahlburg HFL, Pauly IB, Zucker KJ (1991). Interim report of the DSM-IV Subcommittee on Gender Identity Disorders. Archives of Sexual Behavior Volume 20, Number 4 / August, 1991
- Pauly IB (1993). Terminology and classification of gender identity disorders. In Walter O. Bockting, Eli Coleman, eds. Gender Dysphoria: Interdisciplinary Approaches in Clinical Management. Haworth Press ISBN 1-56024-473-9
