= Donna Turnbow =

American former gymnast (born c. 1961)

Donna Jean Turnbow (born c. 1961) is an American former gymnast who was US all-around national champion in 1977. She reached the top score at the September 1978 trials that selected the American team for the 1978 World Artistic Gymnastics Championships.

In 2022 she was inducted into the Southern California Jewish Sports Hall of Fame.

Donna's "Firsts":

1st US gymnast to win an all-around championship outside the U.S. (1978 Champions All, London, with Kurt Thomas winning the men's competition)

1st gymnast to win state, regional, and national titles in same year

1st gymnast to do a front stalter and back stalter in the same bar routine, 1975 Pan Am trials

1st gymnast to do the Nadia Comaneci bar dismount over the low bar, 1977

1977 USA-Romania dual meet at the Superdome in New Orleans

It was the largest audience (20k) for an international gymnastics meet.

When Nadia was given a lower score than Donna on the uneven parallel bars, Bela Karoli (the Romanian coach at that time) and the team threatened to boycott and leave the meet. There was a 30-minute delay and the crowd booed. The judges raised Nadia’s score to tie Donna's score. The media did not cover this part of the story.

The Romanians trained the next day and the U.S. decided they should train as well, even though Donna and others never trained on the day after a meet. Donna was very tired and on the first event (vault) during training, she broke the growth plate in her ankle. Bela carried her to the ambulance.

Education:

Donna graduated from Mayfair High School in 1979. She then was recruited to join the USC Women's Gymnastics Team and graduated from USC in 1983.

Other references:

https://www.espn.com/olympics/gymnastics/story/_/id/45913766/us-gymnastics-championships-history-all-winners-list

https://www.nytimes.com/1977/05/29/archives/responsibility-comes-early-to-15yearold-gymnast.html

https://usagym.org/history/u-s-womens-worlds-rosters/

https://www.gymn-forum.net/bios/women/turnbow.html

https://usagym.org/history/championships/

https://www.scjewishsportshof.org/items/turnbow%2C-donna--%E2%80%94-gymnastics-

https://usctrojans.com/news/2021/10/27/football-former-usc-athletes-ben-rosin-donna-turnbow-named-to-southern-california-jewish-sports-hall-of-fame
