= Joseph Sobek =

Inventor of racquetball

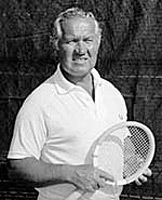
- 2021
- Born: Joseph George Sobek; April 5, 1918; Greenwich, Connecticut, U.S.
- Died: March 27, 1998 (aged 79); Greenwich, Connecticut, U.S.
- Occupation: Professional Tennis player
- Years active: 1937–1985
- Known for: Inventor of Racquetball and founder of Paddle Rackets Association
- Spouse: Nancy Erlichman
- Children: 1

Joseph Sobek (April 5, 1918 – March 27, 1998) was an American professional tennis and American handball player, who invented racquetball in 1949; originally called "paddle rackets". Sobek founded the National Paddle Rackets Association in 1952 and was the first person to be inducted into the Racquetball Hall of Fame.

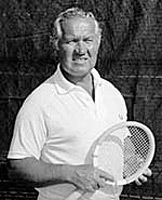
Joseph Sobek sporting his own designed "paddle racket"
