= List of American Handball Women's Champions in the United States =

This page lists the women's national champions in American handball (wall handball) in the United States, organized by year and division.

Year	4W Singles	4W Doubles	3W Singles	3W Doubles	1W Singles	1W Doubles
1980	Rosemary Bellini		Allison Roberts			
1981	Rosemary Bellini	Bellini / Sue Oakleaf	Allison Roberts			
1982	Rosemary Bellini	Allison Roberts / Peanut Motal	Allison Roberts			
1983	Diane Harmon	Allison Roberts / Peanut Motal	Allison Roberts		Anna Calderon	
1984	Rosemary Bellini	Allison Roberts / Peanut Motal	Rosemary Bellini			
1985	Peanut Motal	Sue Oakleaf / LeaAnn Tyson	Rosemary Bellini			
1986	Peanut Motal	Sue Oakleaf / LeaAnn Tyson	Rosemary Bellini	R. Bellini / Nancy Kalil		
1987	Rosemary Bellini	A. Engele / D. Carideo	Rosemary Bellini	R. Bellini / Lisa Fraser		
1988	Rosemary Bellini	R. Bellini / N. Kalil	Rosemary Bellini	R. Bellini / Andra Torrance		
1989	Anna Engele	R. Bellini / N. Kalil	Rosemary Bellini	R. Bellini / Andra Torrance		
1990	Anna Engele (Pro)	L. Fraser / L. Muloin	Rosemary Bellini	R. Bellini / Andra Torrance	Rosemary Bellini (Pro)	
1991	Anna Engele (Pro)	L. Fraser / L. Muloin	Rosemary Bellini	R. Bellini / Andra Torrance	Rosemary Bellini (Pro)	
1992	Lisa Fraser (Pro)	Fraser / Lavonah Muloin	Anna Engele	Allison / Jennifer Roberts	Dori Ten (Pro)	
1993	Anna Engele (Pro)	Engele / Beth Rowley	Anna Engele	Engele / Allison Roberts	Barbara Canton (Pro)	Canton / Ten-Apuzzi
1994	Anna Engele (Pro)	Lisa Fraser / Lavonah Muloin	Anna Engele	Allison / Jennifer Roberts	Barbara Canton (Pro)	Canton / Ten-Apuzzi
1995	Anna Engele (Pro)	Lisa Fraser / Jessica Gawley	Allison Roberts	Beth Rowley / Yvonne August	Dee Stringfield (Pro)	Dee Stringfield / Sydell Smith
1996	Anna Engele (Pro)	Engele / Lupita Alvarado	Anna Engele	Engele / Lupita Alvarado	Karen McConney (Pro)	Barbara Canton / Dori Ten
1997	Lisa Fraser (Pro)	Fraser / Jessica Gawley	Allison Roberts	Roberts / Rosemary Bellini	Dori Ten (Pro)	Barbara Canton-Jackson / Ten
1998	Lisa Fraser (Pro)	Fraser / Jessica Gawley	Anna Christoff	Anna Christoff / Rosemary Bellini	Karen McConney (Pro)	Karen McConney / Adrian Floyd
1999	Anna Christoff (Pro)	Anna Christoff / LeaAnn Martin	Allison Roberts	Allison Roberts / Rosemary Bellini	Priscilla Shumate (Pro)	Karen McConney / Adrian Floyd
2000	Priscilla Shumate (Pro)	Anna Christoff / LeaAnn Martin	Priscilla Shumate	Anna Christoff / Rosemary Bellini	Priscilla Shumate (Pro)	Karen McConney / Adrian Floyd
2001	Anna Christoff	Yvonne August / Priscilla Shumate	Anna Christoff	Anna Christoff / Megan Mehilos	Tracy Davis (Pro)	Barbara Canton-Jackson / Dori Ten
2002	Priscilla Shumate (Pro)	Anna Christoff / LeaAnn Martin	Priscilla Shumate	Priscilla Shumate / Lynn Alesi	Tracy Davis (Pro)	Anna Calderon / Theresa McCourt
2003	Lisa Gilmore (Pro)	Jessica Gawley / Lisa Gilmore	Lisa Gilmore	Lisa Gilmore / Rosemary Bellini	Tracy Davis (Pro)	Tracy Davis / Sydell Smith
2004	Yvonne August (Pro)	Courtney Peixoto / Jessica Gawley	Jennifer Schmitt	Tracy Davis / Sydell Smith	Brenda Pares (Pro)	Anna Calderon / Theresa McCourt
2005	Jennifer Schmitt (Pro)	Lisa Gilmore / Jessica Gawley	Megan Mehilos	Allison Roberts / Jennifer Schmitt	Tracy Davis (Pro)	Anna Calderon / Theresa McCourt
2006	Jennifer Schmitt (Pro)	Lisa Gilmore / Jessica Gawley	Megan Mehilos	Tracy Davis / Jessica Gawley	Theresa McCourt (Pro)	Tracy Davis / Theresa McCourt
2007	Lisa Gilmore (Pro)	Lisa Gilmore / Jessica Gawley	Megan Mehilos	Tracy Davis / Jessica Gawley	Tracy Davis (Pro)	Tracy Davis / Theresa McCourt
2008	Megan Mehilos (Pro)	Anna Christoff / Courtney Peixoto	Megan Mehilos	Sarah Au / Samantha England	Tracy Davis (Pro)	Tracy Davis / Theresa McCourt
2009	Anna Christoff (Pro)	Anna Christoff / Courtney Peixoto	Megan Mehilos	Tracy Davis / Courtney Peixoto	Tracy Davis (Pro)	Tracy Davis / Theresa McCourt
2010	Aisling Reilly (Ire.) (Pro)	Aisling Reilly / Jennifer Hinman	Tracy Davis	Samantha England / Sandy Ng	Sandy Ng (Pro)	Danielle Daskalalis / Sandy Ng
2011	Fiona Shannon (Pro)	Fiona Shannon / Sibeal Gallagher	Megan Mehilos	Tracy Davis / Sandy Ng	Sandy Ng (Pro)	Danielle Daskalalis / Sandy Ng
2012	Aisling Reilly (Pro)	Aisling Reilly / Ashley Prendiville	Megan Mehilos	Tracy Davis / Ashley Moler	Tracy Davis (Pro)	Tracy Davis / Theresa Haley
2013	Aisling Reilly (Pro)	Catriona Casey / Aoife McCarthy	Megan Mehilos		Tracy Davis (Pro)	Tracy Davis / Theresa Haley
2014	Catriona Casey (Pro)	Catriona Casey / Martina McMahon	Tracy Davis		Tracy Davis (Pro)	Danielle Daskalakis / Sandy Ng
2015	Catriona Casey (Pro)	Aisling Reilly / Ciana Ni Churraoin	Megan Dorneker	Hilary Rushe / Carly Stickles	Daneille Daskalakis (Pro)	Danielle Daskalakis / Sandy Ng
2016	Catriona Casey (Pro)		Hillary Rushe	Hilary Rushe / Ashley Moler	Daneille Daskalakis (Pro)	Danielle Daskalakis / Sandy Ng
2017	Catriona Casey (Pro)		Hilary Rushe	Hilary Rushe / Ashley Moler		
2018	Martina McMahon	Aisling Reilly / Martina McMahon	Hilary Rushe	Hilary Rushe / Carly Munson		
2019	Catriona Casey (Pro)		Danielle Daskalakis	Danielle Daskalakis / Jennifer Schmitt		
2020						
2021	Danielle Daskalakis (Pro)		Danielle Daskalakis	Ashley Moler / Mikaila Mitchell		
2022	Catriona Casey	Catriona Casey / Fiona Tully	Ashley Ruiz	Ashley Ruiz / Mikaila Mitchell	Danielle Daskalakis	Danielle Daskalakis / Sandy Ng (Pro)
2023	Catriona Casey	Catriona Casey / Aishling O'Keefe	Danielle Daskalakis	Danielle Daskalakis / Sandy Ng	Danielle Daskalakis (Pro)	Danielle Daskalakis / Tania Juarez (Pro)
2024	Danielle Daskalakis	Clodagh Munroe / Fiona Tully	Mikaila Esser	Mikaila Esser / Jennifer Schmitt		
2025	Mikaila Esser	Mikaila Esser / Aoife Holden	Mikaila Esser	Mikaila Esser / Ashely Ruiz		

== See also ==
- List of American Handball Champions in the United States – men's national champions
