= United States Handball Association =

National governing body for American handball

The United States Handball Association (USHA) is the national governing body for American handball in the United States, a game played mostly in that country. The organization is a 501(c)3 not-for-profit corporation which promotes the game and governs its rules.

Among the organization's specific activities are the sponsorship of tournaments, both amateur and professional, the publication of Handball Magazine, and the sponsorship and management of the Handball Hall of Fame in Tucson, Arizona.

The USHA was founded in 1951 by Bob Kendler of Chicago. In 1982, the national headquarters moved to Tucson. A board of directors runs the organization. The current president of the USHA is Denis Hogan. In 2008, the organization reported having 8,500 members. Some members such as champion player Albert Apuzzi of Coney Island have helped run tournaments.

== Leading players ==
The associations Hall of Fame is run to designate and honor top handball players from various times and in the different varieties of the game.

Among the 38 players in the U.S. Handball Association Hall of Fame are Joe Durso, Albert Apuzzi, Fred Lewis, Joe Platak, Paul Haber, Oscar Obert, Vic Hershkowitz, Simon Singer, and Jim Jacobs.
