= Joe Durso (handballer) =

American handball player

Personal information
- Full name: Joe Durso
- Nationality: United States
- Born: 1955 (age 70–71) New York City

Sport
- Sport: Handball

Joseph (Joe) Durso (born 1955 in New York City) is a former professional American handball player. At age 47 he made the semi-finals of the 2002 Open Singles National One-Wall Championships. He was most famous for his unique style of play, and his antagonistic attitude towards his opponents as well as spectators. While he certainly had the skills and power to end points early, he would often favor moving his opponents around the court, often "toying" with them, in an attempt to humiliate them and exhibit his superiority.

Durso won National Championships in one-wall singles handball in 1982, 1984, 1987–1992, and 1994. He also won National Championships in one-wall doubles handball in 1983, 1984, 1986–1989, and 2003.

In February 2012 Joe Durso was inducted in the Hall of Fame of the United States Handball Association.
