= Fred Lewis (handballer) =

American former handball player (born 1947)

Personal information
- Nationality: American
- Born: 1947 (age 78–79) The Bronx, New York, U.S.

Sport
- Sport: Handball

Achievements and titles
- National finals: 6x U.S. Four-Wall Handball Singles Champion (1972, 1974–76, 1978, and 1981); 3x U.S. Three-Wall Handball Singles Champion (1974, 1977, and 1978)

Fred Lewis (born 1947) is an American former handball player.

Lewis is Jewish, and was born in The Bronx, New York. Both of his parents played handball, and he learned to play the game outdoors in the Bronx. He initially played one-wall handball, and entered his first tournament at the age of eight. He competed on his high school swimming team.

He received a master's degree in education at the University of Miami in 1972. He won two U.S. National Collegiate Singles Championships.

Lewis is a six-time U.S. Handball Association National Four-Wall Handball Singles Champion (1972, 1974–76, 1978, and 1981). He is also a three-time National Three-Wall Singles Champion (1974, 1977, and 1978). He was named 1970s "Handball Player of the Decade" by the United States Handball Association.

He made the finals of the National Open championship 14 consecutive years. He won 16 titles as a professional.

In 1998, he created Yes2Kids, a handball club for children. In 2003, he was head coach of the handball team at the University of Arizona. In 2008, he remarried his ex-wife, as they had reconciled after 16 years.

== Halls of Fame ==
Lewis was inducted into the Handball Hall of Fame in 1993, as its 25th member. He was inducted into the International Jewish Sports Hall of Fame in 2011.
