= Simon Singer =

American actor and handballer

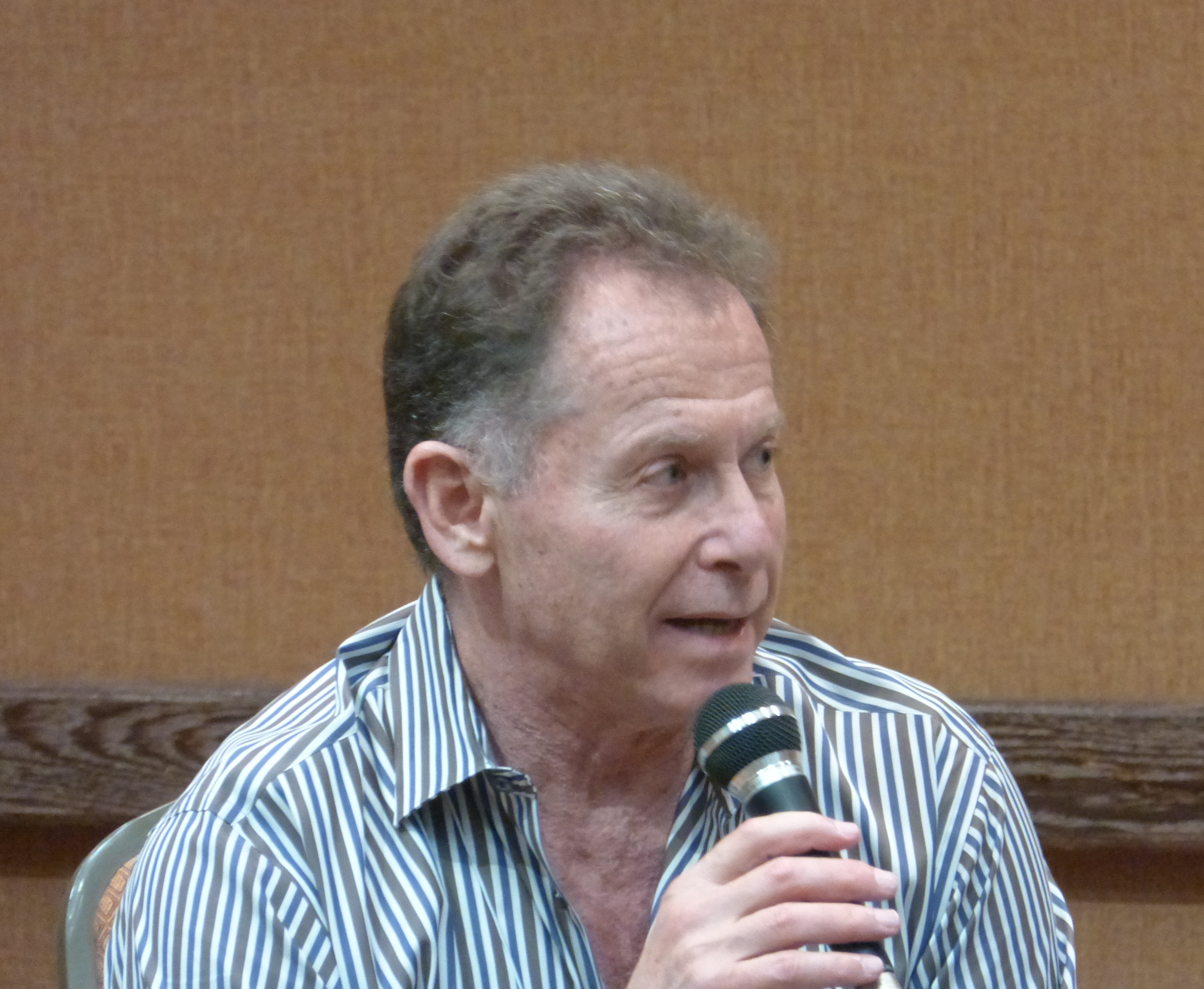
- Singer in 2013
- Born: Simon Singer; November 24, 1941 (age 84); Los Angeles, California, U.S.
- Known for: United States and world champion American handball player; teenage radio and television actor
- Television: Beulah, Blondie and Dagwood, Leave it to Beaver, My Three Sons, My Little Margie, The Life of Riley, and Annie Oakley.

Simon "Stuffy" Singer (born November 24, 1941) is an American former United States and world singles champion American handball player. He has been inducted into the United States Handball Association Hall of Fame. He was also a teenage radio and television actor, starring on the television show Blondie and Dagwood in the 1950s.

== Early life ==
Singer was born in Los Angeles, California, is Jewish, and attended Bancroft Junior High School and Fairfax High School (class of 1957). He lived in Hollywood, California. In addition to American handball, in his youth Singer also competed in table tennis, tennis, football, and baseball.

== Acting career ==
Singer was a teenage radio and television actor. In radio, he appeared in a number of shows, between 1944 and 1955. He played on the TV situation comedy Beulah for two seasons, starting in 1952, playing the role of Donnie Henderson. He starred on the television show Blondie and Dagwood in the 1950s. He played Alexander Bumstead, the son of Blondie and Dagwood Bumstead. He also acted in the television sitcoms Leave it to Beaver, My Three Sons, My Little Margie, and The Life of Riley, and the TV series Annie Oakley.

== American handball career ==
Singer won his first handball national and world singles championships in 1965, and his last in 1988. He won 16 United States, Canadian, and world titles in singles (including the 1967 Open Singles World Championship, and the 1968 USHA four-wall men's singles championship) and doubles (including the 1978 and 1979 men's doubles championships).

In 1971, on behalf of the United States government, Singer toured Germany and England with handballer Jimmy Jacobs, giving clinics and exhibitions to Air Force personnel. When he retired from competition in 1988, Singer was ranked the #5 all-time professional tournament winner.

Singer was inducted into the Southern California Handball Association Hall of Fame in 1984, and into the Southern California Jewish Sports Hall of Fame in 1991. He was also inducted into the United States Handball Association Hall of Fame in 1994.

== Personal life ==
Singer is a tax consultant in Southern California. He and his ex-wife Sunny have two children together.
