= Naty Alvarado =

Mexican handball player

Personal information
- Full name: Naty "El Gato" Alvarado
- Nationality: Mexico
- Born: Ciudad Juárez, Mexico

Sport
- Sport: Handball

Naty "El Gato" Alvarado (born in Ciudad Juárez, Mexico) is a former player of handball. According to the United States Handball Association's hall of fame entry, he is the "[t]he most dominating, winningest handball player" in the history of handball. His style was characterized by an aggressive two-hand offense. "He won his first national championship in 1977 at St. Louis...." He was dominant in the 1980s. He won "63 professional tournaments over a 14-year period." A Mexican national, Alvarado entered the United States illegally but was granted U.S. permanent residency under an amnesty program in the 1980s. His son, Naty, Jr., is also a member of the USHA Hall of Fame.
