= Joe Platak =

American handball player

Personal information
- Full name: Joseph Platak
- Nationality: United States
- Born: 1909
- Died: November 7, 1954 (aged 44–45) Montebello, California, U.S.

Sport
- Sport: Handball

Joseph Platak (1909 – November 7, 1954) was an American handball player in the 1930s and 1940s. He was one of the inaugural inductees to the United States Handball Association's Hall of Fame in 1954.

== Early life ==
The son of a Lithuanian immigrant, Platak grew up in Chicago, a handball hotbed. He briefly attended Loyola University but left it to support his parents. During the early part of his voluntary naval service, he was not allowed to travel to defend his national title. He played for Chicago's Lake Shore Athletic Club. Not until Naty Alvarado did any other player win as many four-wall titles in national open singles play.

== Career ==
Platak was a four-wall player who dominated the sport in the 1930s, winning nine national singles championships from 1935–1945, beating every opponent in just two games. He was also on two doubles championships. In 1948 he placed third in Sullivan Award voting.
