= American handball =

US style ballgame

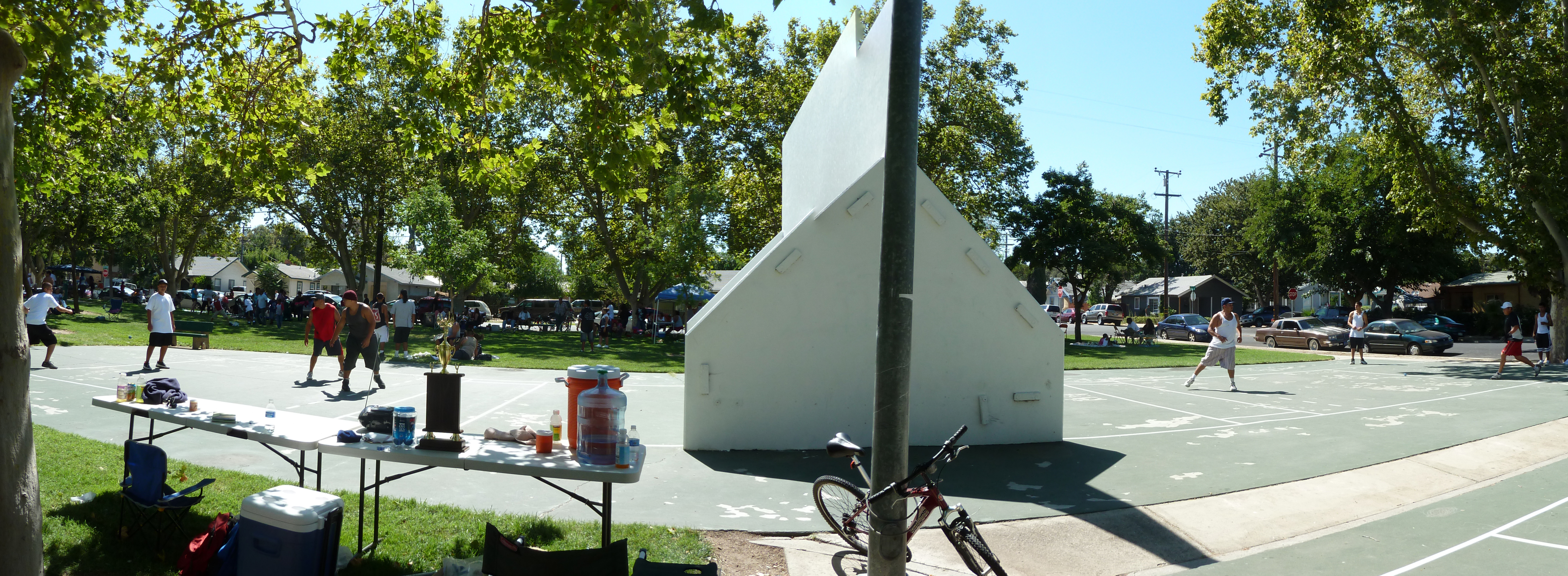
Three-wall handball court with two games in progress

American handball, known as handball in the United States and sometimes referred to as wallball (although the term "one-wall handball" is being adopted to avoid confusion), is a sport in which players use their hands to hit a small, rubber ball against a wall such that their opponent(s) cannot do the same without the ball touching the ground twice or hitting out of bounds. The three versions are four-wall, three-wall and one-wall (sometimes known as wallball or international fronton). Each version can be played either by two players (singles), three players (cutthroat) or four players (doubles), but in official tournaments, singles and doubles are the only versions played.

== History ==
Games in which a ball is hit or thrown have been referenced as far back as Homer and ancient Egypt. A game similar to handball was played by Northern and Central Americans from 1500 BC, most famously by the Aztecs as the Mesoamerican ballgame, but no references to a rebound game using a wall survive. It is thought that these ancient games more closely resembled a form of hand tennis. Further examples of similar games include the European-originated games of Basque pelota (or Jai-alai), Gaelic handball, Valencian frontó, International fronton and Eton fives.

References to similar games (then referred to as either "hand-tennis" and "hand-ball") have been found as early as 1287, when the Synod of Exeter banned the game due to the damage it caused to church buildings. Other notable examples of wall ball games being banned include Robert Braybrooke, Bishop of London, who in 1385 prohibited the game. Another recorded game of striking a ball against a wall using a hand was in Scotland in 1427, when King James I ordered a cellar window in his palace courtyard to be blocked up, as it was interfering with his game. In Ireland, the earliest written record of a similar game is in the 1527 town statutes of Galway, which forbade the playing of ball games against the walls of the town. The first depiction of an Irish form of handball does not appear until 1785. The sport of handball in Ireland was eventually standardized as Gaelic handball. By the mid-19th century, Australians were playing a similar game, which developed into the modern sport of Australian handball.

=== American ===
In Treacherous Beauty, by Mark Jacob and Stephen H. Case, about the Arnold-Andre conspiracy, Major John André and General Sir Henry Clinton are said to have played a game called handball during the American Revolution. The earliest record of the modern game in the United States mentions two handball courts in San Francisco in 1873. The sport grew over the next few decades. By the early 1900s, four-wall handball was well established and a one-wall game was developed in New York City by beach-goers who hit bald tennis balls with their hands against the sides of the wooden jetties that lined beaches. This led to a rise in one-wall handball at New York beaches and by the 1930s, thousands of indoor and outdoor one-wall courts had been built throughout the city. American handball is seen predominantly in parks, beaches, and high school yards in New York City, Lynbrook, New York, Philadelphia, Chicago and other large urban areas.

=== National Championships ===
National championships in handball have been held annually in the United States since 1919. These championships were organized by the Amateur Athletic Union (AAU) until 1950, when their control was transferred to the newly formed United States Handball Association (USHA). For a complete list of champions, see List of American Handball Champions in the United States, and List of American Handball Women's Champions in the United States.

=== Influence on racquetball and wall paddleball ===
The sports of racquetball, squash, fives, four-wall and one-wall paddleball were heavily influenced by handball. Four-wall and one-wall paddleball were created when people took up wooden paddles to play on handball courts. Four-wall paddleball was invented in 1930 by Earl Riskey, a physical-education instructor at the University of Michigan, when he came up with the idea of using paddles to play on the school's handball courts. Racquetball was invented in 1949 by Joseph Sobek in Greenwich, Connecticut, when he played handball using a strung racquet.

== Court ==
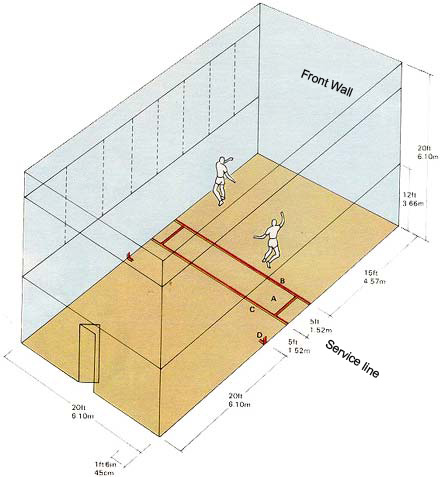
Dimensions of a typical handball court

American handball is played on a walled court, with either a single (front) wall, three walls, or in a fully enclosed four-wall court; four-wall courts typically have a ceiling while three-wall courts may or may not. The four-wall court is a rectangular box. The front wall is 20 feet (6.1 m) square, and the side walls are 40 feet (12.2 m) long and 20 feet (6.1 m) high.

In the middle of the floor lies a short line, dividing the floor into two 20 feet (6.1 m) squares. Also along the floor is the service line, which is 5 feet (1.5 m) in front of the short line. The service zone is the area between these two lines. The back wall of the court is usually 12 feet (3.7 m) high, with an above gallery for the referee, scorekeeper and spectators. Some courts have a glass back wall and glass side walls to allow for better viewing. In three-wall court handball, the court often has a front wall and two full side walls, or the front wall is flanked by two triangular wings.

== Play ==
Handball may be played as singles (two players against each other), doubles (two teams of two players), or "cutthroat" (three players rotating one against two). In cutthroat handball, one server plays against two receivers, until they are "put out" (other terms include "down" or "side out"). Then, the left-most receiver serves. Serves rotate in this way until one player wins by scoring either 7, 11, 15, or 21 points. Should both teams reach a score 1 below the winning score, the game can be continued by "win-by-two" or "straight". In "win-by-two", the winning score is increased by 2 points. In 'straight', the score remains the same and cannot be pushed. When a tie of 20 is reached in a 21-point match, a common decision is 'straight 25', where the winning score is set to 25 and cannot be changed. The cutthroat mode of play is also known as "triangles".

=== Service (4-wall) ===
The ball is served by one player standing in the service zone. The server begins by dropping the ball to the floor of the service zone and striking it, after one bounce, with the hand or fist so that it hits the front wall. The ball must hit the front wall first and it may then hit at most one side wall before the first bounce. The served ball must then bounce on the floor past the short line but before reaching the back wall.

If the served ball lands in front of the short line, it is called a "short", while a serve that reaches the back wall without bouncing is called "long", and a serve that hits both side walls before hitting the floor is called a "3-wall". These are all types of errors known as service faults. After one service fault, the server will have only one serve remaining. The server is "put out" by hitting two faults in a row and becomes the receiver, but if any serve hits the ceiling, floor, or a side wall before hitting the front wall, the server is out (no second serve allowed).

In doubles, the server's teammate has to stand in the service area with their back to a side wall in a service box, marked by a parallel line 18 inches (46 cm) from the side wall, until the ball passes the short line.

=== Return (4-wall) ===
While the server has the ball, the receiver must stand at least 5 feet (1.5 m) behind the short line, indicated by dashed lines extending 6 inches (15 cm) from each side wall. Once the ball is served, the receiver must hit the ball either directly ("on the fly") or after the first bounce. A receiver choosing to take the serve on the fly, however, must first wait for the ball to cross the short line (the dashed line, in racquetball).

The ball can bounce off the floor twice. Also, any player during a return may hit the ball off the floor before it touches the front wall. The server then hits the ball on the rebound from the front wall, and play continues with the opponents alternately hitting the ball until one of them fails to make a legal return. After the serve and return, the ball may be played from anywhere and may hit any number of walls, the ceiling, or a player so long as it hits the front wall before bouncing on the floor. Players can "hinder" (block) their opponents from hitting the ball. Servers failing to make a legal return is "put out" and becomes the receiver. If the receiver fails to make the return, a point goes to the server, who continues to serve until "put out". Only the server/serving team can score points. The game goes to the player/team first to score 21 points. A match goes to the player/team to win two out of three games; the third game goes to 11 points.

== Variants ==
=== Three-wall ===
A three-wall handball court is an outside court with a front-wall, two side-walls (these may be "full" or "half"—half being a pair of sloping side-walls), and no back-wall in the play area. It is played very much like an indoor four-wall court, only with the challenge of returning the ball without any back-wall rebound. The long line at the forty-foot mark is considered out if the ball hits it when hitting the floor.

=== One-wall / Wallball / International fronton ===
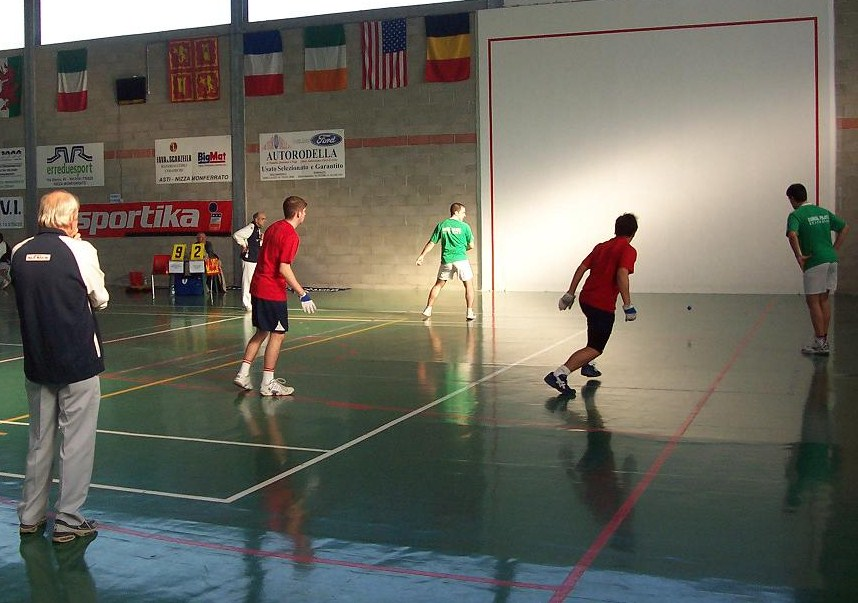
Basque Country vs. England, International Fronton championships, 2007.

One-wall handball courts have a wall 20 feet (6.1 m) wide and 16 feet (4.9 m) high. The court floor is 20 feet (6.1 m) wide and 34 feet (10.4 m) long. When not played as part of tournament or league play, the one-wall game typically uses the bigger ball called "the big blue". The main difference between one-wall handball and other versions is that the ball must always be played off the front wall. One-wall handball can be watched by more people than a four-wall game. The court is also cheaper to build, making this version of handball popular at gymnasiums and playgrounds. In New York City alone, an estimated 2,299 public handball courts occupy the five boroughs.

== Equipment ==
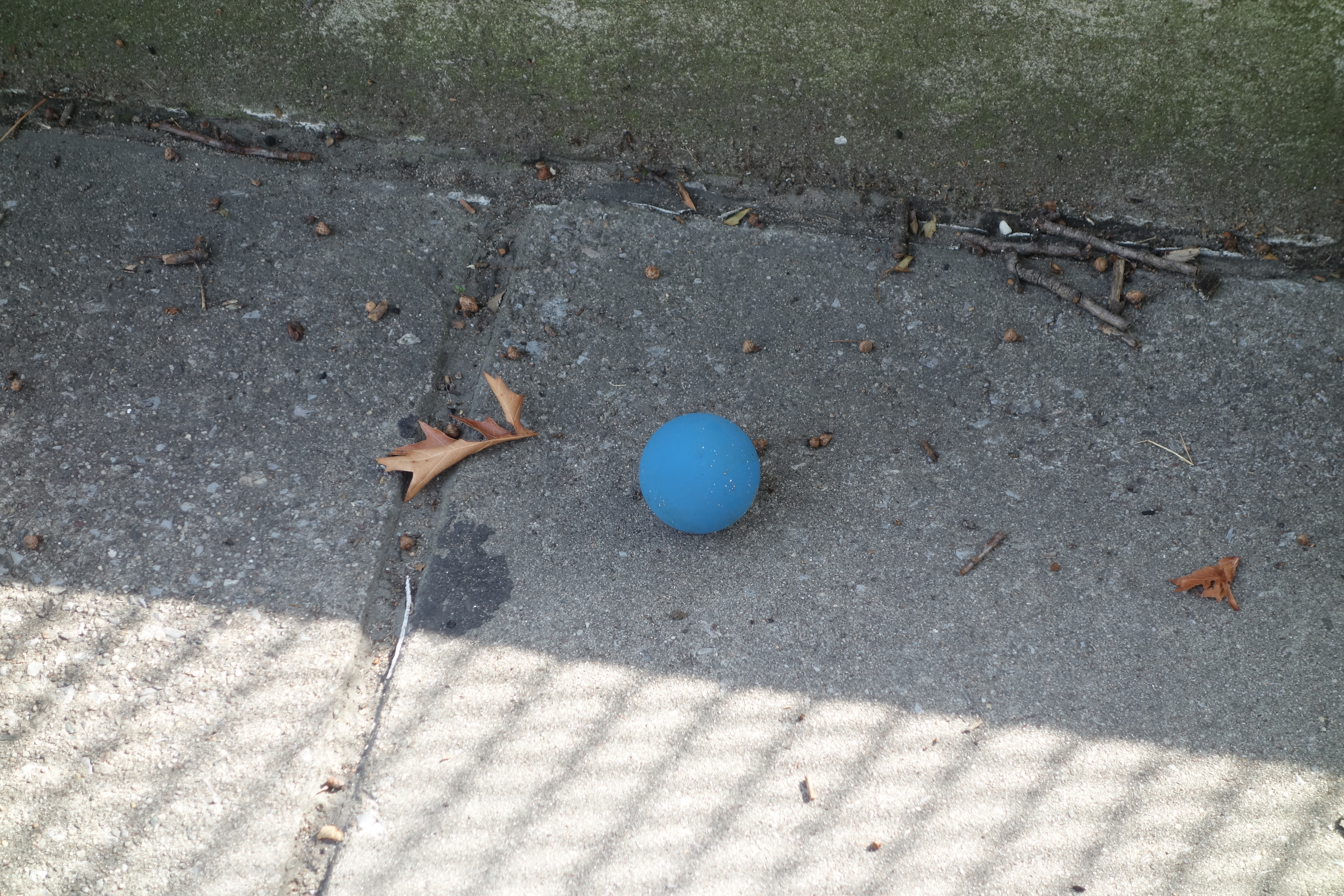
A small handball ball in Williamsburg, Brooklyn, New York City

A typical outfit includes protective gloves, sneakers, athletic shorts and goggles. Eye protection is required in tournament handball, as the ball moves at high speeds and in close proximity to the players. It is rarely used in "street" handball, however, where a softer "big blue" ball is usually used.

The black or blue rubber ball weighs 2.3 ounces (65 g) and is 1.875 inches (4.76 cm) in diameter (smaller, heavier, and more dense than a racquetball), is hit with a gloved hand (open palm, fingers, fist, back of hand) (informal games often do not include gloves).

=== Small ball versus big ball ===
A true handball is referred to as an "ace ball" or, in earlier days, "blackball". A racquetball used to play handball is called a "big ball" or "big blue". A small ball is hard, bounces higher and moves faster. Types of small balls include the Red Ace (for men) and the White Ace (for women). The Red Ace small ball is heavier than the White Ace small ball.

A big ball bounces slower and is softer and hollower than a small ball.

Four-wall games use the small ball almost exclusively. Three-wall and one-wall games use both balls. Both balls are used extensively in New York City, with formal tournaments for big ball, one example being NYC Big Blue. Internationally, the big ball is used most often in the one-wall game (in the European 1-Wall Tour, the big ball is used exclusively for the Tour), but at World Handball Championships organised by the World Handball Council, competitions in both big-ball and small ball are offered for the one-wall code.

== Terms and techniques ==
Term/Technique	Description
Ace	A serve in which the retriever is not only unable to return the ball, but is also unable to touch the ball. In some games, any return from a serve that bb does not make it back to the wall is called an ace.
Backhand	A technique of hitting the ball with the palm of the strong hand so that the palm faces the body. The arm is swung away from the body. This technique is usually used when players who have a weak off-hand or when the ball comes towards the mid-line of the body, and the person lacks the time to move into position.
Block	Occurs when the ball hit by the receiver doesn't reach the wall, but instead directly hits another player, or when the enemy player is directly in the path of the ball that the receiver is unable to see and hit. Should the ball hit a partnering player in a doubles game before the first bounce it results in a down. Should the ball hit any player after the first bounce, it results in a take-two.
Block (Moving)	A call from the receiver to indicate that an opposing player interfered in the receiver's ability to reach and return the ball during a rally. It results in a take-two.
Carry	An illegal move made by a player who cups the ball and moves towards the wall by 'carrying' the ball without actually gripping the ball.
Ceiling shot	A defensive play in a four-wall court in which a player hits the ball hard and upward, so that it first contacts the ceiling and then the front wall, usually forcing the opponent to go to the back of the court to make a return.
Crack	When the ball hits a crack in the ground or wall and moves in an erratic direction. In some games it is considered a live ball that can still be hit like a normal exchange, in others it results in take-two.
Cut/chop/slice	A shot in which the player puts a heavy spin on the ball, causing the ball to bounce off the wall in an erratic motion. To perform a cut, the ball must be struck by a sudden twist in the hand and/or fingers. The main purpose of these shots is to throw off the opponent's hitting rhythm.
Down	Term used for when the ball hits the floor before the wall. Also refers to serving two 'shorts' or 'longs' in a row. It is commonly used for any mistake in-play as well. It is an error, ends the rally and results in a point or change of server.
Fist	A shot made by hitting the ball with a closed fist. It can launch the ball in very different directions due to the bone shape of the hand. It often puts more force into the ball as opposed to the regular slap, keeping the momentum of the ball continuous. It is often considered illegal to fist a serve.
Flag	To distract the opponent by creating unnecessary noises or movements in front of the other player. A flag is often a physical distraction by making large movements around the vicinity of the ball blocking the opponent's view of the ball. Such movement is considered a flag when it occurs closer the ball, but distant from the opposing player, as there is much time to hit the ball after the flag, whereas a block occurs instantaneously leaving no time to prepare. A take-two may be called, but is not necessary.
Hook	A shot with spin that veers off to one side.
Hinder	Term used when one side's play is interfered with. Most hinder calls result in a replay of the point.
Kill	A shot (usually side-arm or underhand) in which the player hits the ball so that it hits very low on the front wall, causing the ball to rebound low to the ground. This shot can end a rally, although it is possible to pick up a kill. Although it helps the player win the rally immediately, it is risky given the chance of missing and hitting the floor. A variation of the killer is the corner-kill. A corner-kill is a kill shot that is aimed at the extreme left or right of the wall. In one-wall, this shot has more risk than a normal kill because the player runs the risk of hitting the ball out. A corner-kill is often more difficult to pick up because players usually occupy the center of the court, making the shot harder to reach.
Lob (overhead shot)	In one-wall handball, an underhand shot in which the player hits the ball to the wall in a high arc such that the ball is launched back high above the top of the wall through a parabolic path that results in the ball landing near the long line. This tactic is mainly used against short players or players who hover near the front of the court. An overhead shot is similar, but can be used with an overhand shot, must be hit near the top of the wall, and does not go any higher, unlike the lob.
Long	When the ball is served over the long line.
Natural	Typical hook bounce, to the left from a right-handed player.
Pass shot (corner shot)	A shot where the ball passes an opponent low and fast near one of the side walls, out of the opponent's reach.
Pop	Occurs when the ball is hit at a 45 degree or similar angle to bisect the right angle of the wall and floor. Hitting the ball to cause a pop results in the ball 'popping' upwards. It is often identified on court by a distinct popping noise and sometimes the occurrence of dirt flying upon hitting the wall and floor, even leaving a mark on the ball as a result. A pop results in a down.
Reverse	Hook bounce towards the right from a right-handed player. So named since it is the opposite of a "natural" hook.
Roller	A shot where the ball is hit towards the very bottom of the wall leaving little space for the ball to bounce, causing it to instead roll. It is a guaranteed end to the rally as it is impossible to pick up due to the ball rolling instead of bouncing.
Short	When the ball is served before the short line.
Shut-out	A challenge play where a player (in a singles match) or team (in a doubles match) attempts to score a set number of points without allowing the opposing party to score. A shut-out is used to end a game early in 11, 15, or 21 point matches, with the shut-out score often being 7. In such case, it is referred to as a 7-Zip Shut-out.
Spike	Similar to that in volleyball, the spike is a shot in which the player slams the ball down from a high altitude to hit the base of the wall. Doing so forces the ball to bounce up much higher than it usually would.
Take-One	A call made in doubles games. At the start of a game, if the serving team does not score a certain number of points (often three), the defending team may call take-one to become the serving team. This skips the second-man serve bringing the defending team to the front to serve.
Take-Two	A redo of the rally, no points are given and no penalties occur.

== Variations ==
- School handball is an extended version of handball played at schools across the nation. It has three modes of play: freestyle, old school, and new school.
- Wall ball is a generic name for a variety of similar street games played by children, often with tennis balls.
- Prison handball is a simplified version of handball popular in North American prisons.
- Frisian handball is a Dutch version known as Kaatsen.
- Picigin is a Croatian game played since 1908 in Split on Bachvitse (Bačvice) beach in shallow water with attractive dives to keep the ball in the air.
- Chinese handball is another variation of handball (albeit developed in America) where the return must hit the ground before the wall. There are no teams in this variation.

== Notable players ==
- Naty Alvarado
- Albert Apuzzi
- Paul Brady
- David Chapman
- Paul Haber
- Vic Hershkowitz
- Jimmy Jacobs
- Fred Lewis
- Oscar Obert
- Joe Platak
- Robert Ripley
- Simon Singer (born 1941), American world champion player
- John "Rookie" Wright

== See also ==
- Baseball5, a variation of baseball in which the batters hit using their bare hands
- Handball
- Patball
- Wallball
