= Paul Brady (handballer) =

Handballer and Gaelic footballer

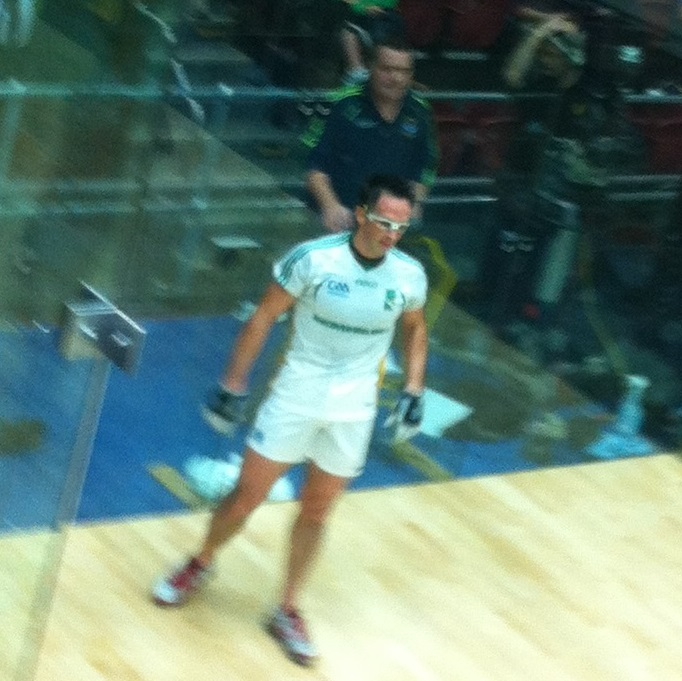

Personal information
- Native name: Pól Ó Brádaigh (Irish)
- Born: September 20, 1979 (age 47) Cavan, Ireland
- Occupation: Teacher

Sport
- Sport: Handball, Gaelic football
- Position: Half-back
Inter-county
- Years: County
- 2005–: Cavan

Paul Brady (born 20 September 1979) is an Irish 4-wall handball and Gaelic football player. Born in Cavan, he is a six-time World 4-Wall Handball Singles Champion - winning his titles in 2003, 2006, 2009, 2012, 2015 and 2024. His latest title came against Diarmaid Nash at the 2024 World Championships hosted in Dublin, Ireland.

His first five Men's Singles titles, which occur triennially, were consecutive - the last one being in 2015 when he defeated Killian Carroll in Calgary, Canada. It looked like they were on the path to a rematch at the 2018 World Championships in Minneapolis, Minnesota, but Brady had an ankle injury prior to his semi-final match and had to forfeit to Martin Mulkerrins. Carroll went on beat Mulkerrins to win his first World title, breaking Brady's five consecutive title streak. No World Championship was held in 2021 due to the ongoing COVID-19 pandemic.

== Underage handball career ==
Brady was introduced to the sport as a 12-year-old by Fr. John Gilhooly, a teacher in St. Patrick's College, Cavan. While he showed an early aptitude and won an All Ireland Feile title in 1993, Brady didn't win his first "full" All-Ireland title until the age of 16, partnering Pauric Kiernan to the U16 doubles crown in 1995. In 1997, he defeated Meath's Carl Browne in an all-Irish 17 and under final at the World Championships in Winnipeg, Canada. The win was a mild shock at the time and marked Brady out as an outstanding prospect. The following year, Brady landed the prestigious Minor Singles title, defeating Dublin's Eoin Kennedy for the first time in a marathon final in Roscommon.

== Senior handball career ==
Having won the minor title, the flesh title, Brady began to travel regularly to the US for tournaments. In June 1998, he won the US Nationals 19 and Under Singles in Los Angeles; won the Junior Nationals in the same age group the following December in Chicago, Illinois and won the title again the next June, this time in Baltimore, Maryland.

At home, he advanced to intermediate ranks and won the All Ireland the first time of asking, defeating Eoin Kennedy in the semi-final and Kerry's Dominick Lynch in the final in Ballaghedereen, Co Roscommon. The following February, Brady again defeated Brad Alesi, this time in the final of the USHA Collegiates in Minneapolis, a tournament which draws the best college handballers in Ireland and North America and has come to be seen as a stepping stone to the professional ranks. That autumn, Brady made it to the last four of the World Championship Open Singles in Chicago, losing a heartbreaking 11-8 tiebreaker to top American John Bike.

The stage seemed set for a major impact at the senior level back at home, but it took the Cavanman some time to adjust. A crop of dominant senior players, including Ducksy Walsh, Walter O'Connor and Tom Sheridan were coming to the end of their senior 40x20 careers at this time and with the emergence of young stars such as Brady, Kennedy, Carlow's Kenneth Kane and, most of all, Cork's Tony Healy, the senior scene was extremely competitive at this time. Brady would suffer a number of heartbreaking defeats – games which he has often cited as being crucial to his later success – before he finally made a senior breakthrough. He lost the All Ireland senior final, in a tiebreaker to Healy, the Irish Nationals final, the senior doubles final, and the singles and doubles trials for the World Championships in 2000 and 2001.

Healy, just a year older than Brady, became senior champion as soon as he graduated from intermediate and would win the title three times before he lost a senior championship match. He and Brady became close friends, as well as on-court rivals, and in 2001 the pair began to travel to the US in an attempt to break on to the USHA Pro Tour.

At the time, no Irish player had ever qualified for the tour, but Healy and Brady bucked the trend, reaching the final of a qualifying tournament in Atlanta in late 2001.

Their first tournament on the circuit was in Peoira, Illinois and the pair would travel to Sacramento, Dallas, Juarez, South Bend, Modesto and Las Vegas up to June 2002, by which point Brady was beginning to assert himself as the top Irish player and a coming force on the world scene. In December 2002, two months after his 22nd birthday, he defeated top Californian Vince Munoz in the final of a pro stop in Milwaukee to become the first Irishman to win such an event, which was a massive milestone in the history of the sport and a turning point in Brady's career.

He followed up with a first All-Ireland senior title in March 2003, defeating Healy 21–6, 21–18 at O'Loughlin's, Kilkenny, in the final, and added the doubles title with Michael Finnegan against Meath.

In October of the year, he won the first of four World Open Singles titles, again defeating Healy in an epic match which is often referred to as the greatest game ever played.

Suffering from a cramp, Brady looked as if he may be forced to withdraw from the match, but in a sporting gesture, Healy called several time-outs in succession and Brady was able to play on. He ultimately defeated Healy, effectively on one leg, in a tiebreaker, and added the doubles title, again with Finnegan, the following morning.

In 2004, Brady began the season with a career-best win over David Chapman, who is commonly regarded as the second-greatest player of all time and who at that point was the world number one, in the final of the Ultimate Handball Showdown in Seattle. Brady comfortably defeated the Californian to win the first prize of $50,000, still the richest purse in the sport's history.

He followed up by claiming second and another $10,000 check to Chapman the following week in Alaska, but it would be 12 months before Brady finally became the first Irishman to win the US Nationals, the most prestigious tournament in America with a century of history behind it.

At the 2005 renewal in Houston, Texas, Brady saw off Healy 21–12, 21–5 in the semi-final before defeating Danny Bell (Canada) - who had shocked American Naty Alvarado Jr in the semi-final, on the same scoreline in the final.

The following June, Brady retained his US Nationals title, defeating Alvarado 21–2, 21–18 on the Californian's home court at Los Cabaleros in LA. He also added the US Nationals Open Doubles title with Finnegan, seeing off top Americans Vince Munoz and Marcos Chavez in an 11-10 tiebreaker in the semi-final.

In August, he followed up with his second world title, this time in Edmonton, Canada, again defeating Healy in straight games in the final. All the while, Brady was continuing his unbeaten run in the Irish senior championships, defeating Healy and Eoin Kennedy in a succession of finals.

In 2009, Brady retained his US Nationals title in June and that October, in Portland, Oregon, he overcame a serious quad injury to come through a tough field in the World Championships, eventually beating Texan Allan Garner in an 11-7 tiebreaker in the final to claim his third world title.

He followed this up with two more All Ireland senior titles, seeing off first-time finalist Charly Shanks of Armagh in 2010 and again in 2011, overcoming a career-threatening finger injury in the latter year, an injury which saw him miss the US Nationals, in which he had been unbeaten since 2005.

2012 was an annus mirabilis for the Cavanman. Back from injury, he trounced new rival Robbie McCarthy 21–6, 21–1 in the All Ireland senior final and followed up by reclaiming his US Nationals title with a final win over Shanks.

In October, he announced plans to retire from Irish singles play in 2013 before winning his fourth World Open Singles crown, defeating American Luis Moreno 21–19, 21–10 in a magnificent final watched by 4,000 fans in CityWest, Dublin.

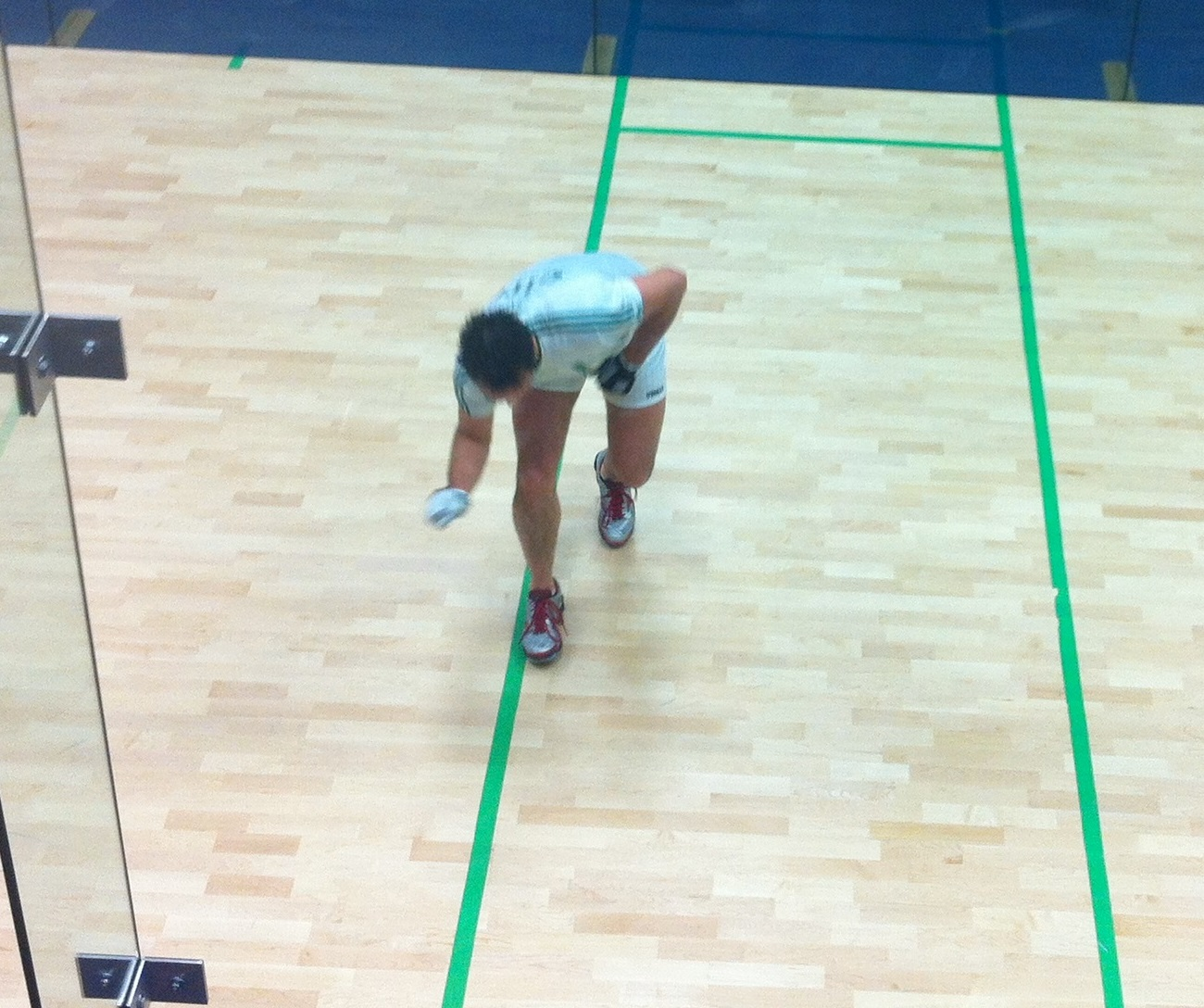
Brady in action during the 2012 World Championships in CityWest, Dublin.

Two weeks later, he defeated Charly Shanks in the final of the Simple Green US Open in Los Angeles, his fourth time to win the event.

== Gaelic football career ==
Brady was first called into the Cavan senior panel by Mattie Kerrigan in the winter of 2002. He played for Cavan for nine years, generally at wing-back but also in the half-forward line, and was regarded as one of the most consistent players in the county. He earned a call-up to the Ulster squad for the inter-provincial series and has two county U21 medals, three Cavan SFC medals (1998, 2006 and 2012) and one Senior League medal (2012) with Mullahoran Dreadnoughts. He was Man of the Match in the 2012 county final win over Kingscourt Stars. Brady's uncle was the great Phil 'The Gunner' Brady who played for Cavan for many years, winning three All-Ireland medals.
