= Vic Hershkowitz =

American handball player

- Born: 5 October 1918; Brooklyn, New York
- Died: 23 June 2008 (aged 89); Plantation, Florida
- Occupation: Handball player
- Spouse(s): Eleodora P. Serradilla, Jennie Tartaglia
- Children: Lawrence Hershkowitz, Arthur Hershkowitz, Rachel Hershkowitz

Vic Hershkowitz (5 October 1918 – 23 June 2008) was a dominant handball player who played from the early 1940s to the early 1960s. He won 23 amateur national titles. He was a New York City fireman. His accomplishments include winning forty national and international handball titles, including nine consecutive Three-Wall Singles Championships. He died 23 June 2008 in Plantation, Florida.
