= Paul Haber =

American handball player (1937–2003)

Personal information
- Born: January 7, 1937; Brooklyn, New York, U.S.
- Died: March 31, 2003 (aged 66); San Diego, California, U.S.
- Nationality: United States

Paul Haber (January 7, 1937 – March 31, 2003) was an American one, three, and four wall National Handball champion. Haber is credited with being the first player to use the ceiling offensively and did so very effectively. He was inducted into the United States Handball Association Hall of Fame in 1983. Paul Haber was born of Polish Jewish ancestry in the Bronx in 1937. He won countless American and Canadian handball titles. Haber took an overlooked sport and turned it into a publicized one. Haber appeared on the front page of the Wall Street Journal in 1970. Numerous magazines featured him including Sports Illustrated, Ace, and Argosy. It was not just Haber's ability on the court that caught national media attention. Haber would clobber the straight arrow handball players and then wind up in jail or a hospital after days of being on a bender with various females. He supported himself giving handball and golf lessons, playing cards, pool, board games, and betting on his handball matches.

Playing both singles and doubles in 3 and 4-wall handball tournaments,"Ironman" Haber won hundreds of weekend and regional tournaments. Haber was notorious for his daily hours and hours on the court and playing with outstanding defense. He is buried in San Diego, California.

Haber's peak years for national handball single and doubles titles were from the late 1960s to the mid-1970s. In this time, he won five four-wall singles championships, three three-wall doubles championships, and one three-wall singles championship. His primary doubles partner was Armando (Paul) Morlos. In an exhibition match, Haber defeated national masters racquetball champion Dr. Bud (Mule) Muelheisen.

An authoritative biography of Haber suggests that he suffered from a personality disorder. Undiagnosed, Unscrupulous and Unbeatable, The Paul Haber Story suggests the beatings he received from his father, Sam Haber as well as an undiagnosed, untreated mental condition, played major roles in Haber's controversial disposition.

A free documentary, Paul Haber:Against the Wall, is available online at numerous sites. The 24-minute free movie tribute to Haber discovered during filming that he was buried in an unmarked indigent grave with graffiti. The movie makers raised money and got Paul Haber a tombstone. He had been forgotten and his final resting place found unfit for a national handball champion. The filmmakers assisted getting Haber inducted into the Southern California Jewish Sports Hall of Fame.

== Sources ==
- Sports Illustrated articles on Paul Haber late 60s and early 70s
- United States Handball Association Online. September 26, 2007.
