= Oscar Obert =

American handball player

Personal information
- Nationality: United States
- Born: 1931 – June 24
- Died: 2016

Sport
- Sport: Handball

Oscar Obert (December 5, 1930 – June 24, 2016) was an American one, three, and four wall National Handball Champion.

Obert won 42 open national and world titles (which includes twenty open USHA national titles), more than any other player in the history of the sport. Oscar Obert, together with his younger brothers Carl and Ruby, were dominant players in the mid-1950s through to the mid-1960s, winning 92 open national and world titles, including consecutive championships in the early 1960s in both singles and doubles.

Obert was inducted into the Handball Hall of Fame in 1972.

The funeral was held at Kensico Cemetery, Tower Garden lot #99 located at 273 Lakeview Ave. Valhalla, NY. The time was approximately 11:30 a.m.

== Sources ==
- Hinckley, David 2003 "Hand and Ball", New York Daily News February 25, 2008
- United States Handball Association
