= Gaelic games =

Set of sports originating, and mainly played in Ireland

Gaelic games (Irish: Cluichí Gaelacha) are a set of sports that originated in Ireland, where they are particularly popular although also played worldwide. They include Gaelic football, hurling, Gaelic handball and rounders. Football and hurling, the most popular of the sports, are both organised by the Gaelic Athletic Association (GAA). Women's versions of hurling and football are also played: camogie, organised by the Camogie Association of Ireland, and ladies' Gaelic football, organised by the Ladies' Gaelic Football Association. While women's versions are not organised by the GAA (with the exception of handball, where men's and women's handball competitions are both organised by the GAA Handball organisation), they are closely associated with it but are still separate organisations.

Gaelic games clubs exist all over the world. They are Ireland's most popular sports, ahead of rugby union and association football. Almost a million people (977,723) attended 45 GAA senior championships games in 2017 (up 29% in hurling and 22% in football on 2016 figures) combined with attendances at other championship and league games generating gate receipts of €34,391,635.

Gaelic games are designated within the primary school curriculum as requiring "particular consideration." They were showcased at the Château de Vincennes during the 2024 Paris Olympics, the first time Gaelic football and hurling had featured at an Olympics since 1904.

== Gaelic football ==
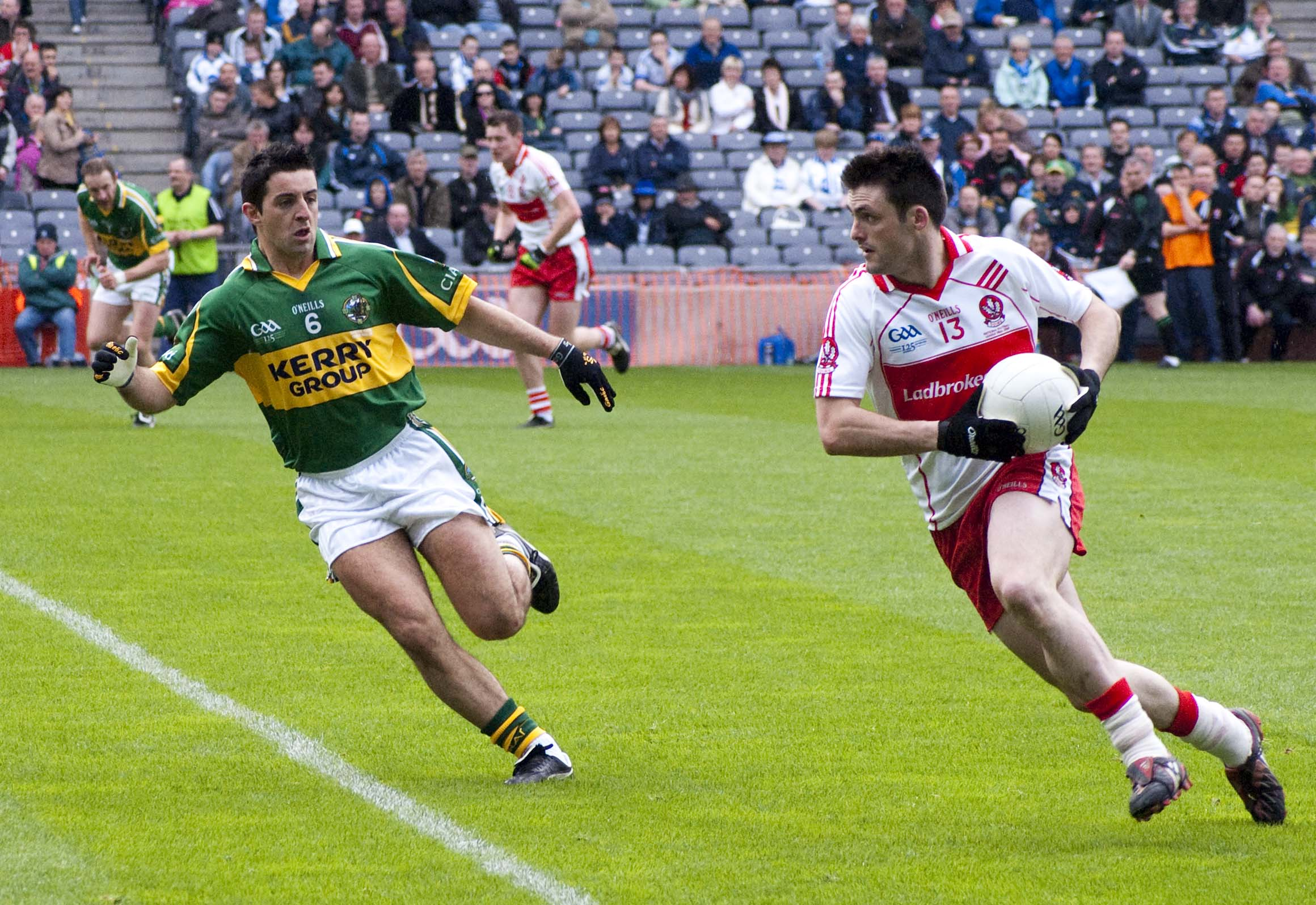
Footballers Aidan O'Mahony (Kerry) and Eoin Bradley (Derry) during the 2009 National League final

Gaelic football is played by teams of 15 on a rectangular grass pitch with H-shaped goals at each end. The primary object is to score by driving the ball through the goals, which is known as a goal (worth 3 points), or by kicking the ball over the bar, which is known as a point (worth 1 point). The team with the highest point score at the end of the match wins. The female version of the game is known as ladies' Gaelic football and is similar to the men's game with a few minor rule changes. Other formats with teams of 7 to 11 players are played in Europe, Middle East, Asia, Argentina and South Africa utilising smaller soccer or rugby pitches.

== Hurling ==
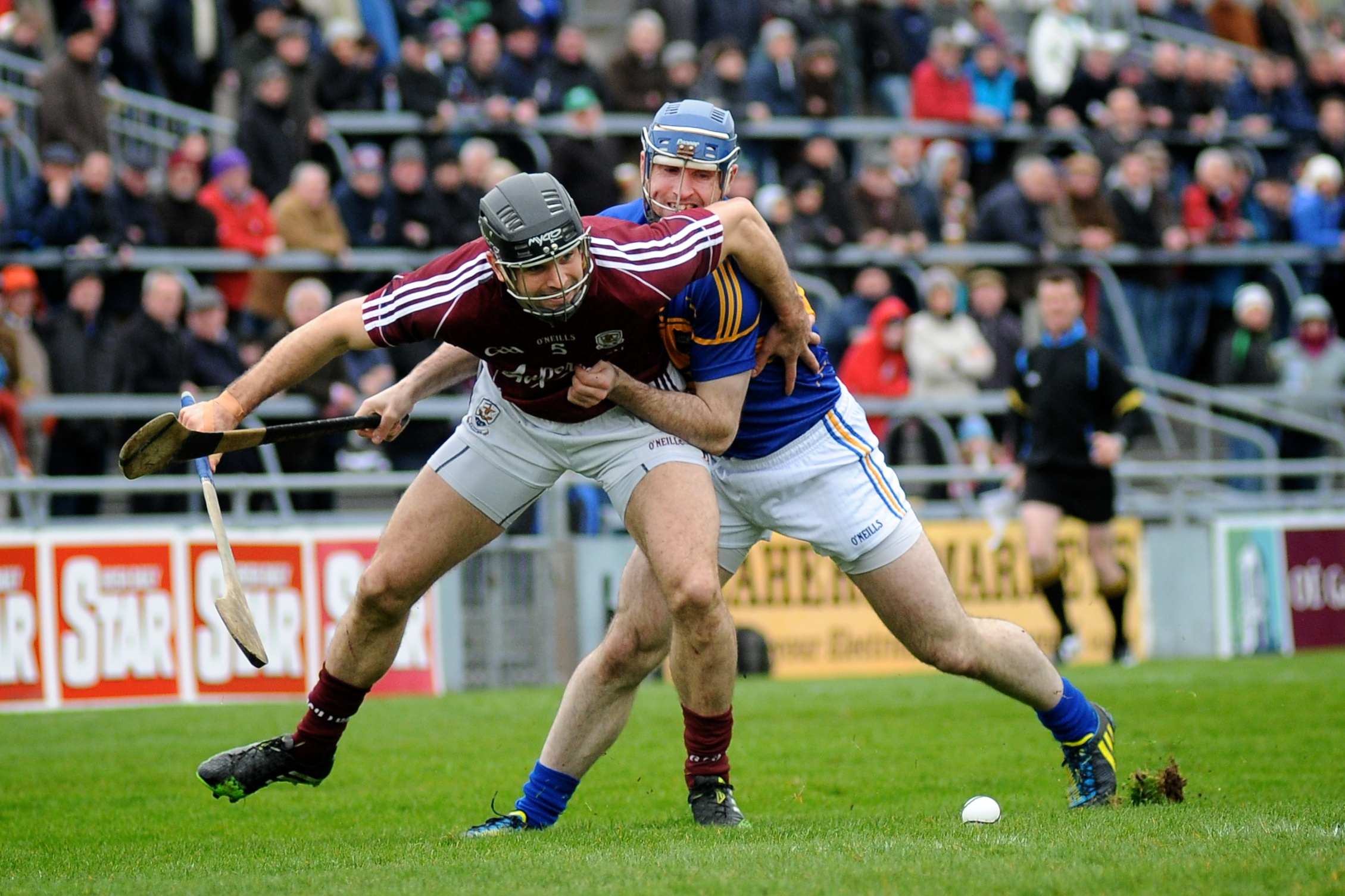
Hurlers David Collins (Galway) and Eoin Kelly (Tipperary) in the 2014 National League

Hurling is a stick and ball game played by teams of 15 on a rectangular grass pitch with H-shaped goals at each end. The primary object is to score by driving the ball through the goals or putting the ball over the bar and thereby scoring a point. Three points is the equivalent of a goal. The team with the highest score at the end of the match wins. It is over three thousand years old, and is said to be the world's fastest field game, combining skills from lacrosse, field hockey, and baseball in a hard-hitting, highly skilled game. The female version of the game is known as camogie and is very similar to hurling with a few minor rule changes. Other formats with teams of 7 to 11 players are played in Europe, Middle East, Asia, Argentina and South Africa utilising smaller soccer or rugby pitches.

== Gaelic handball ==
Gaelic handball is a game in which two players use their hands to return a ball against a wall. The game is similar to American handball. There are four codes of handball: Softball (also known as '60x30' or 'big alley' due to the playing court dimensions), 4-Wall (also known as '40x20' or 'small alley'), 1-Wall and Hardball (can also be known as '60x30'; played in the same court as Softball). 1-Wall handball is the most popular international version of handball, played in over 30 countries. The sport's governing body, GAA Handball, oversees and promotes the game in Ireland.

== Rounders ==
Rounders is a bat-and-ball game which is played in Ireland; a similar version is played in Britain. Rounders is organised by a subdivision of the GAA known as the Rounders Council of Ireland. It is similar to the American game softball.

== Other Gaelic games ==
Other Gaelic games such as Gaelic athletics have nearly or completely died out. When founded, the GAA organised a number of Gaelic athletics competitions but passed the responsibility to the National Athletic and Cycling Association in 1922. Tailteann Games with Gaelic athletics were held until 1932.
