= Rule 42 =

Gaelic games rule

Rule 42 (now Rule 5.1 and Rule 44 in the 2008 guide) is a rule of the Gaelic Athletic Association (GAA) which in practice prohibits the playing of non-Gaelic games in GAA stadiums. The rule is often mistakenly believed to prohibit foreign sports at GAA owned stadiums. However, non-Gaelic games such as boxing and American football did take place in Croke Park before Rule 42 was modified.

== The drive to have Rule 42 changed ==
In the early 2000s the GAA came under pressure to allow non-Gaelic games be played in Croke Park so that the Football Association of Ireland could be joint hosts of Euro 2008. Subsequently, the association was asked to modify the rule so that the Ireland national rugby union team and Republic of Ireland national football team would not have to play their home games outside Ireland while the Lansdowne Road stadium was being redeveloped. A number of motions to change Rule 42 failed or were blocked from being put on the agenda with the majority of the opposition coming from the Ulster counties. The Rule was finally modified in 2005 to allow the playing of association football and rugby union in Croke Park only while Lansdowne Road was being redeveloped. The motion gave the GAA's central council the power to decide which games would be allowed in Croke Park. The motion to the GAA's annual congress passed 227–97, thus obtaining the two-thirds majority required.

== When the redevelopment of Lansdowne Road is complete ==
It was agreed that once the redevelopment of Lansdowne Road (now called the Aviva Stadium) was completed, Rule 42 would revert to its 2005 wording. However, high-profile GAA members including Seán Kelly, former GAA president, expressed the view that the rule should not be reversed. On 17 April 2010 the GAA voted to keep Croke Park open after the redevelopment of Lansdowne Road.

== Outside Croke Park ==
In addition to the opening of Croke Park to competing sports, local GAA units have sought to rent their facilities out to other sports organisations for financial reasons in violation of Rule 42. The continued existence of Rule 42 has proven to be controversial since the management of Croke Park has been allowed to earn revenue by renting the facility out to competing sports organisations, but local GAA units which own smaller facilities cannot. It is also said that it is questionable as to whether or not such rental deals would actually be damaging to the GAA's interests.

== Wording of the rule ==
The original wording of Rule 42 is:

Grounds controlled by Association units shall not be used or permitted to be used, for horse racing, greyhound racing, or for field games other than those sanctioned by Central Council.

The 2005 amendment added the sentence:

Central Council shall have the power to authorise the use of Croke Park for games, other than those controlled by the Association, during a temporary period when Lansdowne Road Football Ground is closed for the proposed development.

== The first games in Croke Park ==
The first game to take place under the relaxed Rule 42 took place on 11 February 2007. It was a Six Nations Championship rugby union match between Ireland and France which Ireland lost 17–20. The following match against England generated some controversy, since it involved the playing of "God Save the Queen" at a ground where British soldiers had killed fourteen spectators on Bloody Sunday, 1920. There was a small protest by Republican Sinn Féin outside the ground. Ireland won the match by 43 points to 13.

== A world record attendance ==
In early February 2009, with possibility of an all Irish semi-final in the 2008–09 Heineken Cup, the GAA confirmed that club rugby would also be allowed under the relaxing of Rule 42. The game was played in Croke Park on 2 May 2009, when Leinster defeated Munster 25–6. The attendance of 82,208 set a then world record attendance for a club rugby union game.

== The policy broadens ==
Following the success of the use of Croke Park for non-Gaelic sports, the GAA has since passed multiple motions allowing for expanded consideration of facilities by other sports. The policy of allowing use of Croke Park for other games on a case-by-case basis was made permanent in 2010, with Leinster using the ground for United Rugby Championship or European Rugby Champions Cup knockout stage games and an NFL International Series game coming to Dublin in 2025. Since 2019, primary county grounds as well as certain grounds located outside Ireland but owned by the GAA may apply to GAA Central Council to host other sports, provided that "events are considered to be in the broad interest of the Association and in accord with its aims". A notable beneficiary of the expansion of this policy has been Páirc Uí Chaoimh in Cork, which has hosted a UEFA Women's Euro 2025 soccer qualifier as well as occasional friendly and testimonial matches. Several League of Ireland clubs, including Derry City F.C. and Galway United F.C., have also used county Gaelic grounds in their areas while their own stadiums were being renovated.

== See also ==
- Rule 21
- List of non-Gaelic games played in Croke Park
- List of Gaelic Athletic Association stadiums
- Sport in Ireland
