= Gaelic football at the 1904 Summer Olympics =

Gaelic football at the Games of the III Olympiad
- Dates: 20 July 1904

Medalists
1st place, gold medalist(s)		Fenians; United States
2nd place, silver medalist(s)		Innisfáils; United States

Gaelic football was featured in the Summer Olympic Games unofficial programme in 1904. At least one match was played between Fenians of Chicago, Illinois and Innisfails of host city St. Louis, Missouri. Fenians and Innisfails faced each other on 20 July 1904 and Fenians won 10-0. Innisfails' hurling team also featured in and won the hurling competition.

== Final ==
20 July 1904

Innisfails (United States)	0–10	(United States) Fenians
	Report

== Aftermathers ==
Gaelic football was showcased at the Château de Vincennes during the 2024 Summer Olympics in Paris, the first time it had featured at an Olympics since 1904.
