= List of non-Gaelic games played in Croke Park =

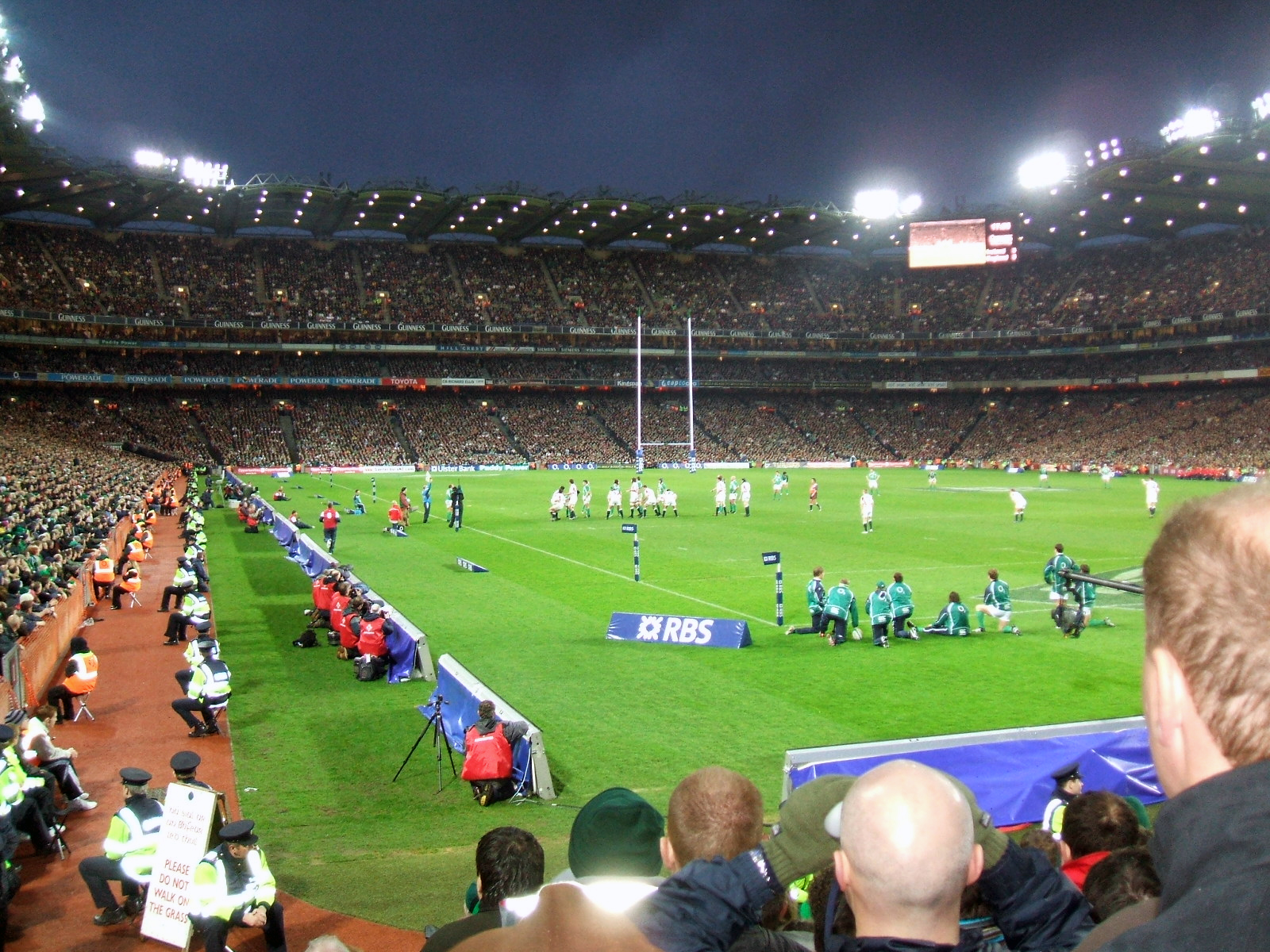
A rugby union match taking place at Croke Park during the 2007 Six Nations Championship

The following is a list of non-Gaelic games played at Croke Park (formerly Jones's Road). The Gaelic Athletic Association formerly prohibited the playing of foreign sports at GAA-owned stadiums under Rule 42 of its rule book.

Grounds controlled by Association units shall not be used or permitted to be used, for horse racing, greyhound racing, or for field games other than those sanctioned by Central Council.

— Rule 42, GAA rule book

While this wording remains as the current Rule 5.1(b), a footnote now reads:

(Note: Central Council shall have the power to authorise the use of Croke Park for games other than those controlled by the Association.)

— Rule 5.1(b), Official Guide

In practice the rule was only applied to the sports of football and rugby, which were perceived to be rivals to the playing of Gaelic games. Cricket was also banned, but Croke Park is too small for a cricket field. As such, several games of American football have been played with rule 42 in force, as well as a boxing match and a baseball game. The rule was officially relaxed in 2005 for the duration of the reconstruction of Lansdowne Road, to allow for the playing of Republic of Ireland football and Irish rugby internationals. The Republic of Ireland football and Ireland rugby internationals moved into the new Aviva Stadium on the former Lansdowne Road site upon its opening in May 2010; the last international in either sport at Croke Park was the rugby team's 2010 Six Nations home fixture with Scotland on 20 March.

On 17 June 2010 the Australia national cricket team had a training session in Croke Park ahead of their One Day International against Ireland.

== American football ==
Date	Competition	Teams	Score	Notes	Attendance	Ref
1946	Exhibition game	American servicemen returning from World War II				
21 November 1953	US Air Force League	Burtonwood Bullets vs. Wethersfield Raiders	27–0	USAFE teams based in the UK, playing to raise funds for the Irish Red Cross.	est. 40,000	
2 November 1996	Shamrock Classic	Notre Dame vs. Navy	54–27		38,651	
27 July 1997	American Bowl	Pittsburgh Steelers vs. Chicago Bears	30–17		30,269	
30 August 2014	Croke Park Classic	Penn State vs. UCF	26–24		53,304	
28 September 2025	NFL International Series	Pittsburgh Steelers vs. Minnesota Vikings	24–21	First regular season NFL game in Ireland	74,512	

== Association football (soccer) ==
Date	Competition	Teams	Score	Attendance	Notes	Ref
24 March 2007	European Championship Qualifier	Republic of Ireland vs. Wales	1–0	72,539	First international goal scored at Croke Park by Stephen Ireland.	
28 March 2007	European Championship Qualifier	Republic of Ireland vs. Slovakia	1–0	71,297		
13 October 2007	European Championship Qualifier	Republic of Ireland vs. Germany	0–0	67,495		
17 October 2007	European Championship Qualifier	Republic of Ireland vs. Cyprus	1–1	45,500		
6 February 2008	Friendly	Republic of Ireland vs. Brazil	0–1	70,000		
24 May 2008	Friendly	Republic of Ireland vs. Serbia	1–1	42,500		
15 October 2008	World Cup Qualifier	Republic of Ireland vs. Cyprus	1–0	55,833		
19 November 2008	Friendly	Republic of Ireland vs. Poland	2–3	61,000		
11 February 2009	World Cup Qualifier	Republic of Ireland vs. Georgia	2–1	65,000		
28 March 2009	World Cup Qualifier	Republic of Ireland vs. Bulgaria	1–1	60,002		
10 October 2009	World Cup Qualifier	Republic of Ireland vs. Italy	2–2	70,640		
14 October 2009	World Cup Qualifier	Republic of Ireland vs. Montenegro	0–0	50,212		
14 November 2009	World Cup Qualifier	Republic of Ireland vs. France	0–1	74,103	Only Irish competitive defeat at Croke Park.	
12 August 2026	Friendly	(England) Leeds United vs. Manchester United (England)	1–1	82,300	First non-international match played at Croke Park.	

Ireland's record at Croke Park
Competition	Played	Won	Drawn	Lost	% Won	% Lost
European Championship Qualifier	4	2	2	0	50%	0%
International Friendly	3	0	1	2	0%	66.67%
World Cup Qualifiers	6	2	3	1	33.33%	16.67%
Total	13	4	6	3	30.77%	23.08%

Updated 2 June 2021

== Baseball ==
Date	Competition	Teams	Score	Notes	Attendance	Ref
1946	Exhibition game	Burtonwood Dodgers vs. Mildenhall Yankees	3–4	Teams of American servicemen based in England.		
25 April 1948	Exhibition game	USS Fresno vs. USS Johnston & USS Rush	20–5	Two teams from US Navy played a game of softball	21,617	

== Boxing ==
Date	Fight	Result	Notes	Attendance	Ref.
July 1923	(Republic of Ireland) Bartley Madden v (United States) George Christian	Madden win			
August 1926	(Republic of Ireland) Bartley Madden v (New Zealand) Tom Heaney	Heaney won on points after 20 rounds.	The undercard included Battling Brannigan.		
19 July 1972	(Hungary) / (United Kingdom) Joe Bugner vs (Canada) Paul Nielsen	Bugner wins by TKO in Round 6		18,725	
19 July 1972	(United States) Muhammad Ali vs (United States) Al "Blue" Lewis	Ali wins by TKO in Round 11	A documentary film was made about the fight, When Ali Came to Ireland (2012)	18,725	
5 September 2026	(Republic of Ireland) Katie Taylor vs (France) Flora Pili	Taylor won by unanimous decision	For WBA, WBC, IBF, WBO, IBO and The Ring female super lightweight titles.	82,000	

== Rugby union ==
Date	Competition	Teams	Score	Attendance	Notes	Ref
11 February 2007	2007 Six Nations Championship	Ireland vs. France	17–20	81,572	First try scored by Raphaël Ibañez. First Irish try by Ronan O'Gara.	
24 February 2007	2007 Six Nations Championship	Ireland vs. England	43–13	81,611	Ireland's first & largest win in Croke Park	
2 February 2008	2008 Six Nations Championship	Ireland vs. Italy	16–11	75,387		
23 February 2008	2008 Six Nations Championship	Ireland vs. Scotland	34–13	74,234		
8 March 2008	2008 Six Nations Championship	Ireland vs. Wales	12–16	75,000		
15 November 2008	2008 Autumn internationals	Ireland vs. New Zealand	3–22	77,500	Ireland's largest defeat in Croke Park	
22 November 2008	2008 Autumn internationals	Ireland vs. Argentina	17–3	68,352		
7 February 2009	2009 Six Nations Championship	Ireland vs. France	30–21	82,000		
28 February 2009	2009 Six Nations Championship	Ireland vs. England	14–13	82,000		
2 May 2009	2008-09 Heineken Cup Semi-Final	Munster vs. Leinster	6–25	82,208	At the time a World record attendance in club rugby union.	
15 November 2009	2009 Autumn internationals	Ireland vs. Australia	20–20	69,886		
28 November 2009	2009 Autumn internationals	Ireland vs. South Africa	15–10	74,950		
6 February 2010	2010 Six Nations Championship	Ireland vs. Italy	29–11	77,686		
13 March 2010	2010 Six Nations Championship	Ireland vs. Wales	27–12	81,314		
20 March 2010	2010 Six Nations Championship	Ireland vs. Scotland	20–23	80,313	Last try scored by Tommy Bowe. Last points by Dan Parks (78th min penalty)	
4 May 2024	2023–24 European Rugby Champions Cup Semi-finals	Leinster vs. (England) Northampton Saints	20–17	82,300	Record attendance for a Champions Cup fixture	
12 October 2024	2024–25 United Rugby Championship	Leinster vs. Munster	26–12	80,468	Record attendance for a United Rugby Championship fixture	
6 April 2025	2024–25 European Rugby Champions Cup Round of 16	Leinster vs. (England) Harlequins F.C.	62–0	55,627		
14 June 2025	2025 United Rugby Championship Grand Final	Leinster vs. (South Africa) Bulls	32–7	46,127	Record attendance for a domestic league final played in Ireland	
18 October 2025	2025–26 United Rugby Championship	Leinster vs. Munster	14–31	51,859		
19 June 2026	2026 United Rugby Championship Grand Final	Leinster vs. (South Africa) Bulls	36–7	39,184	Leinster record their second consecutive and 10th overall league championship	

Ireland's record at Croke Park
Competition	Played	Won	Drawn	Lost	% Won
Test Match	4	2	1	1	50%
Six Nations	10	7	0	3	70%
Total	14	9	1	4	64.29%

Updated 26 May 2021

Leinster's record at Croke Park
Competition	Played	Won	Drawn	Lost	% Won
European Rugby Champions Cup	3	3	0	0	100%
United Rugby Championship	4	3	0	1	75%
Total	7	6	0	1	85.71%

Updated 19 June 2026

== Special Olympics ==
Year	Dates	Competition	Type	Season	# of Sports	Notes
2003	21–29 June	2003 Special Olympics World Summer Games	Special Olympics World Games	Summer	23	
