= Gaelic football =

Irish team sport, form of football

Gaelic football Peil Ghaelach
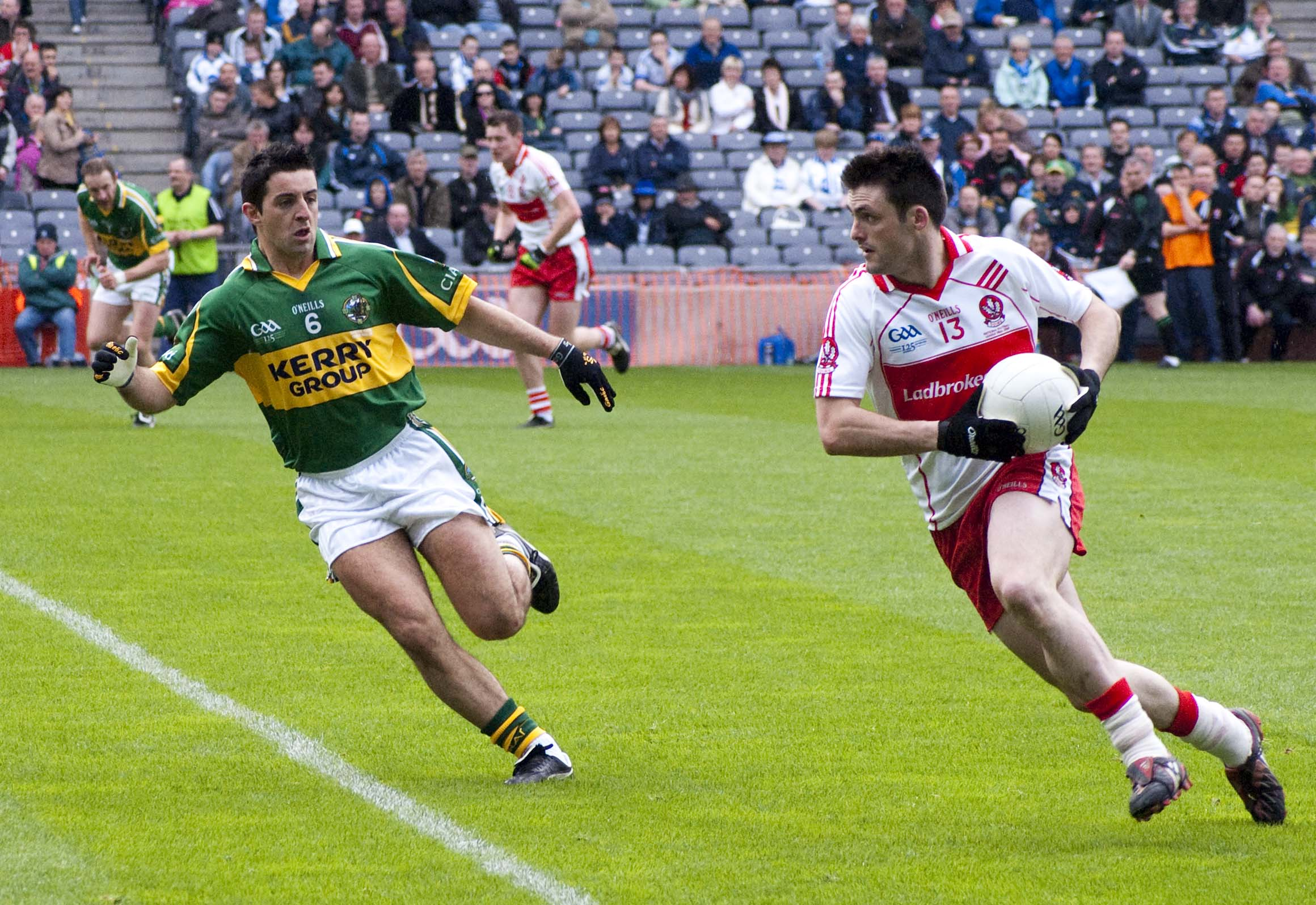
- Gaelic footballers in action during the 2009 National Football League Final
- Highest governing body: Gaelic Athletic Association (GAA)
- Nicknames: Caid; Football; Gaelic; GAA
- First played: 1885; 141 years ago
- Clubs: More than 2,600

Characteristics
- Contact: Limited
- Team members: 15 per team
- Mixed-sex: No
- Type: Outdoor
- Equipment: Gaelic ball
- Venue: Gaelic games field

Presence
- Olympic: 1904 (demonstration sport)
- Paralympic: No

Gaelic football (Irish: peil Ghaelach; short name peil), commonly known in Ireland as simply Gaelic, GAA, or football, is an Irish team sport. A form of football, it is played between two teams of 15 players on a rectangular grass pitch. The objective of the sport is to score by kicking or palming the ball into the other team's goal (3 points) or between two upright posts above the goal and over a crossbar 2.5 metres (8 ft 2 in) above the ground (1 point).

Players advance the ball up the field with a combination of carrying, bouncing, kicking, hand-passing, and soloing (dropping the ball and then toe-kicking the ball upward into the hands). In the game, two types of scores are possible: points and goals. A point is awarded for kicking or hand-passing the ball over the crossbar, signalled by the umpire raising a white flag. Two points are awarded if the ball is kicked over the crossbar from a 40-metre range marked by a D-shaped arc, signalled by the umpire raising an orange flag. A goal is awarded for kicking the ball under the crossbar into the net (the ball cannot be hand-passed into the goal), signalled by the umpire raising a green flag. Positions in Gaelic football are similar to those in other football codes and comprise one goalkeeper, six backs, two midfielders, and six forwards, with a variable number of substitutes.

Gaelic football is one of four sports (collectively referred to as the "Gaelic games") controlled by the Gaelic Athletic Association (GAA), the largest sporting organisation in Ireland. Along with hurling and camogie, Gaelic football is one of the few remaining strictly amateur sports in the world, with players, coaches, and managers prohibited from receiving any form of payment. Gaelic football is mainly played on the island of Ireland, although units of the Association exist in Great Britain, mainland Europe, North America, Africa, Asia and Oceania.

The final of the All-Ireland Senior Championship, held every year at Croke Park, Dublin, draws crowds of more than 80,000 people. Outside Ireland, football is mainly played among members of the Irish diaspora. A notable exception is France, where it has been growing lately, not least in the Celtic region of Brittany. Gaelic Park in New York City is the largest purpose-built Gaelic sports venue outside Ireland. Three major football competitions operate throughout the year: the National Football League and the All-Ireland Senior Championship and the Tailteann Cup operate on an inter-county basis. All-Ireland Club Championship is contested by individual clubs. The All-Ireland Senior Championship is considered the most prestigious event in Gaelic football.

Under the auspices of the GAA, Gaelic football is a male-only sport; however, the related sport of ladies' Gaelic football is governed by the Ladies' Gaelic Football Association.

Similarities between Gaelic football and Australian rules football have allowed the development of international rules football, a hybrid sport, and a series of Test matches was played from 1984 to 2017.

== History ==
While Gaelic football as it is known today dates back to the late 19th century, various kinds of football were played in Ireland before this time.

=== Ancient Mob football (caid) ===
The first legal reference to football in Ireland was in 1308, when John McCrocan, a spectator at a football game at Novum Castrum de Leuan (the New Castle of the Lyons or Newcastle), was charged with accidentally stabbing a player named William Bernard. A field near Newcastle, County Dublin is still known as the football field. The Statute of Galway of 1527 allowed the playing of "foot balle" and archery but banned "hokie — the hurling of a little ball with sticks or staves" as well as other sports.

By the 17th century, the situation had changed considerably. The games had grown in popularity and were widely played. This was due to the patronage of the gentry. Now instead of opposing the games it was the gentry and the ruling class who were serving as patrons of the games. Games were organised between landlords with each team comprising 20 or more tenants. Wagers were commonplace with purses of up to 100 guineas (Prior, 1997).

The earliest record of a recognised precursor to the modern game dates from a match in County Meath in 1670, in which catching and kicking the ball were permitted.

However even "foot-ball" was banned by the severe Sunday Observance Act of 1695, which imposed a fine of one shilling (a substantial amount at the time) for those caught playing sports. It proved difficult, if not impossible, for the authorities to enforce the Act and the earliest recorded inter-county match in Ireland was one between Louth and Meath, at Slane, in 1712, about which the poet Séamas Dall Mac Cuarta wrote a poem of 88 verses beginning "Ba haigeanta".

A six-a-side version was played in Dublin in the early 18th century, and 100 years later, there were accounts of games played between County sides (Prior, 1997).

By the early 19th century, various football games, referred to collectively as caid, were popular in County Kerry, especially the Dingle Peninsula. Father W. Ferris described two forms of caid: the "field game" in which the object was to put the ball through arch-like goals, formed from the boughs of two trees; and the epic "cross-country game", which lasted the whole of a Sunday (after mass) and was won by taking the ball across a parish boundary. "Wrestling", "holding" opposing players, and carrying the ball were all allowed.

==== Accounts from the Irish diaspora ====
Some accounts of traditional Irish football come not from Ireland, but from the Irish diaspora, often in celebrating traditional events such as St Patrick's Day. The largest such communities existed in Britain, the United States, Australia, and New Zealand. Many of the earliest football matches in Australia date back to the 1840s amongst Irish immigrants. In the Colony of South Australia, there are several accounts of Irish football being played at Thebarton in 1843 and again in 1853. There were similar accounts of football in the 1840s in the Colony of Victoria including Melbourne at Batman's Hill and the goldfields in the Colony of Victoria. The account of H C A Harrison, one of the seminal in the history of Victorian football, of Irish rules was that it gave players "the full ability to kick anybody that came within reach". Shin-kicking (or hacking) was a major feature of traditional Irish football and also one of the main reasons why it failed to be widely adopted in Australia. Irish football was also played in the Colony of New Zealand in the 1860s and 1870s in Auckland during Thomas Croke's term as Archbishop there. An 1882 theatrical performance in New York portrays a controversial Irish football match on Saint Nicholas Day 6 December 1790 at the school of Champs de Mars in Paris. Despite a large Irish population references to it being played in America before the 1880s are scant. USGAA makes the unsourced claim that matches were played at Hyde Park, San Francisco in the 1850s.

=== First appearance of modern football ===
During the 1860s and 1870s, rugby football started to become popular in Ireland. Trinity College Dublin was an early stronghold of rugby, and the rules of the (English) Football Association were codified in 1863 and distributed widely. By this time, according to Gaelic football historian Jack Mahon, even in the Irish countryside, caid had begun to give way to a "rough-and-tumble game", which even allowed tripping.

The first account of what the founders of modern Gaelic football referred to as Irish football dates to 1873. Paddy Begley notes that in County Kerry in 1870 only soccer and rugby were played, although historian Paddy Foley notes that by 1874 a third, very different form of football began to emerge and spread across South-West Ireland. At Killarney, these highly popular matches were virtually indistinguishable from Australian Rules Football (first codified in 1859 and the oldest extant football code globally). This kicking variety of football was even played with an oval ball which became customary in Australia in the 1870s and that scoring was achieved only by kicking goals. A major difference between the two styles is that the Irish variety featured high kicking "up and under" whereas in colonial Victoria, the little marks or foot passes were much more common. While the founders of the game were all familiar with or played rugby, including Cusack and Davin, few had played Irish football as it was so rare outside of the South-West, though the influence of this football on the founders was obvious, this is most likely the "football kicking under the Irish rules" that Thomas Croke later recalled in County Cork.

Irish football is a great game and worth going a long way to see when played on a fairly laid out ground and under proper rules. Many old people say just hurling exceeded it as a trial of men. I would not care to see either game now as the rules stand at present. I may say there are no rules and therefore those games are often dangerous.

— Maurice Davin, 1884

Irish historian Garnham, citing R.M. Peter's Irish Football Annual of 1880, argued that Gaelic football did not exist before the 1880s and curious about the origin of the distinctive features believed that clubs from England in 1868 most likely introduced elements of their codes including the "mark" (a free kick to players who cleanly catch the ball, which was a feature of the matches played in the 1880s), lack of offside and scoring by kicking between the upright posts. Unable to identify the source of these peculiar traits he concluded that they must have been introduced by Trinity, Cambridge (those known as the 1858 Cambridge Rules) and Blackheath (1862 club rules).

County Limerick was a stronghold of the game in the 1880s, and the Commercials Club in Limerick, founded by employees of Cannock's Drapery Store, was one of the first to impose a set of rules, which was adapted by other clubs in the city. These rules are believed to be the basis for the rules that were later adopted by the GAA and appear to have contained some of the Victorian Rules of 1866. It is not known how or when these Victorian Rules reached Ireland, though many of the goldrush Irish immigrants returned to Ireland during the 1870s and 1880s as the colonial fortunes faded. At a similar point in time, the same football rules were proposed as an alternative to those of soccer and rugby in northern England but did not take root there. Playing the code under its own rules the club (representing County Limerick) later won the inaugural 1887 All-Ireland Senior Football Championship Final.

English (Association) football started to take hold, especially in Ulster, in the 1880s. By the mid-1880s it had become so popular that it was feared by many to completely displace Irish football.

Ball-playing, hurling, football kicking, according to Irish rules, 'casting', leaping in various ways, wrestling, handy-grips, top-pegging, leap-frog, rounders, tip-in-the-hat, and all such favourite exercises and amusements amongst men and boys, may now be said to be not only dead and buried, but in several localities to be entirely forgotten and unknown.

— Thomas Croke, 1884 letter to Michael Cusack

Irish football, however, continued its grip on the southern counties. Accounts from 1889 state that the variety of football that was becoming popular in Ireland in 1884 bore little resemblance at all to the old mob football and was received by the public as more a hybrid of English and Scotch football.

=== Codification and Administration ===
Irish forms of football were not formally arranged into an organised playing code by the Gaelic Athletic Association (GAA) until 1884 with the rules widely distributed in 1887. The GAA sought to promote traditional Irish sports, such as hurling, and to reject "foreign" (particularly English) imports. The first Gaelic football rules, showing the influence of hurling (and incorporating some of the Victorian Rules of 1866 and 1877) represented the strong desire to differentiate from association football (and rugby)—for example in their lack of an offside rule. The rules were first drawn up by Maurice Davin in 1884 and later published in the United Ireland magazine on 7 February 1887. The original rules bear many similarities to modern football with the requirement to kick, handpass, and the basic scoring system, however, the original rules also included many Australian features including additional scoring posts (removed later in 1910). The code had already begun to diverge, with the mark being deprecated, the soccer ball being adopted, and carrying the ball not allowed, as such there was no requirement to bounce or solo the ball carrying the ball remained illegal until the turn of the 20th century. The game was intended to promote peace and harmony, rejecting the violence of other football codes, and Davin even included a requirement for players to hold hands with their opponents though this practice fell out of favour.

On 15 February 1885, the first game of Gaelic football played under unofficial rules, developed by Maurice Davin, was played at the Fair Green in Callan, County Kilkenny. A local team from Callan played a Kilkenny Commercials team who travelled the 10 1/2 miles from Kilkenny City. 21 men lined up aside & the game finished with no score a piece. The Fair Green was home to John Locke's GAA Club for nearly 100 years until the new facilities were developed alongside. From 1886 the GAA banned tackling.

==== GAA rules of 1887 ====
The widely published GAA rules were as follows:

1. The ground for full teams (21 aside) shall be 140 yards long by 84 yards broad, or as near that size as can be got. The ground must be properly marked by boundary lines. Boundary lines are to be at least five yards from the fences. Note— There is no objection to a larger ground.

2. There shall not be less than 14 or more than 21 players a side in regular matches.

3. There shall be two umpires and a referee. Where the umpires disagree the referee's decision shall be final. There shall also be a goal umpire at each end of the ground to watch for goals and points. The referee shall keep the time, and throw up the ball at the commencement of each goal.

4. The goalposts shall stand at each end in the centre of the goal line. They shall be 21 feet apart, with a crossbar 8 feet from the ground. Besides the goal posts, there shall be two upright posts standing in each goal line 21 feet from the goal posts. A goal is won when the ball is driven between the goalposts and under the crossbar. A point is counted when the ball is driven over the crossbar, or the goal line, within 21 feet of either goal post.

5. The captains of the teams shall toss for choice of sides before commencing play, and the players shall stand in two ranks opposite each other in the centre of the field until the ball is thrown up, each holding the hand of one of the other side.

6. Pushing or tripping behind, holding from behind, catching below knees, or butting with the head, shall be deemed foul, and the player so offending shall be ordered to stand aside for such time as the referee may think fit, and his side cannot substitute another man. Wrestling shall not be allowed.

7. The time of actual play shall be one hour, and sides are to be changed only at half-time.

8. When a player drives the ball over the sideline, it shall be thrown back from the point where it first crossed the line by a player on the opposite side. It may be thrown in any direction. When the ball is driven over the goal line, and not through the goal, the goalkeeper shall have a free kick from the goal, and no player on the opposite side to approach nearer than the 21-yard line until the ball is kicked. If the ball is driven over the goal line by a player whose goal line it is, it shall count one point for the opposite side; if driven over the goal line within 21 feet of either goal post, it shall count three points; if through the goal it shall count a goal.

9. The match shall be decided by the greater number of goals. When no goal is made, or when the goals are even, it shall be decided by the greater number of points.

10. The ball must be struck with the hand. It may be caught when off the ground, and the player catching it may kick it any way he pleases, but must not carry it or throw it forward. Note. — There is nothing in this rule to prevent a player from throwing the ball a little in front to allow himself more freedom in kicking it.

11. Where the rules are broken the referee may allow a free kick if he thinks fit. In such a free kick the ball must be kicked from the ground. No player on the opposite side is to approach nearer than 14 yards until the ball is kicked; but if the free kick is allowed nearer than 14 yards of the goal line, the opposite players need not stand behind that line.

12. If the ball strikes a bystander near the sideline, except the referee or umpire, it shall be considered out of play and must be thrown in as directed in Rule 8. If it occurs near the goal line it shall be considered out of play and must be kicked from the goal. In the latter case, the referee may allow one point or more if he thinks fit.

13. The referee shall have, during the match, full power to disqualify any player or order him to stand aside and discontinue play, for any act he may consider unfair, as set out in Rule 6, or for vicious play.

No nails or iron tips are allowed on the boots. Strips of leather fastened on the soles will prevent slipping. The dress for hurling and football is to be knee breeches and stockings and shoes or boots.

=== Game spreads ===
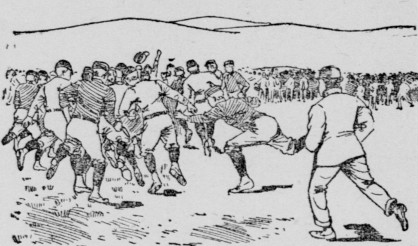
Emmets vs Sarsfields one of the earliest matches in the United States at Golden Gate Park San Francisco in July 1892

Gaelic football spread throughout the world in the late 19th century. Despite a huge Irish American population there was limited awareness of the game in America, though there was limited knowledge of its rules, apart from that the ball cannot be lifted from the ground by hand, and throttling is banned. It was first played in North America in the 1890s with games being played in both Canada and the United States in 1892. More than a dozen clubs had been established in the US by 1893. The first clubs appeared in England in 1896.

Around 1900 the game began to resemble more closely to the running game of today, players were able to lift the ball off the ground and run and carry it if they bounced it every 4 yards.

The first match played in Australia was in 1902 finding a niche in Queensland during a period when Australian football there was in recess.

=== Increasing nationalism ===
Some Gaelic Athletic Associations began to impose strict nationalistic policies during this time. For example, in Connacht free kicks began to be introduced into some leagues penalising speaking of any language but Irish, and imposing a rule that the referee may speak only in Irish.

On Bloody Sunday in 1920, during the Irish War of Independence, a football match at Croke Park was attacked by the Royal Irish Constabulary (RIC), including its Auxiliary Division. 14 people were killed and 65 were injured. Among the dead was Tipperary footballer Michael Hogan, for whom the Hogan Stand at Croke Park (completed in 1924) was named.

In 1930 the GAA banned children found playing rugby instead of Gaelic football.

=== 20th century Gaelic football ===
In 1939, at Yankee Stadium in New York City, Kerry played Galway in front of a crowd of 70,000 spectators.

By 1958, Wembley Stadium hosted annual exhibition games of Gaelic football in England, before tens of thousands of spectators.

Ladies' Gaelic football has become increasingly popular with women since the 1970s.

=== Interactions with Australia (1967–present) ===
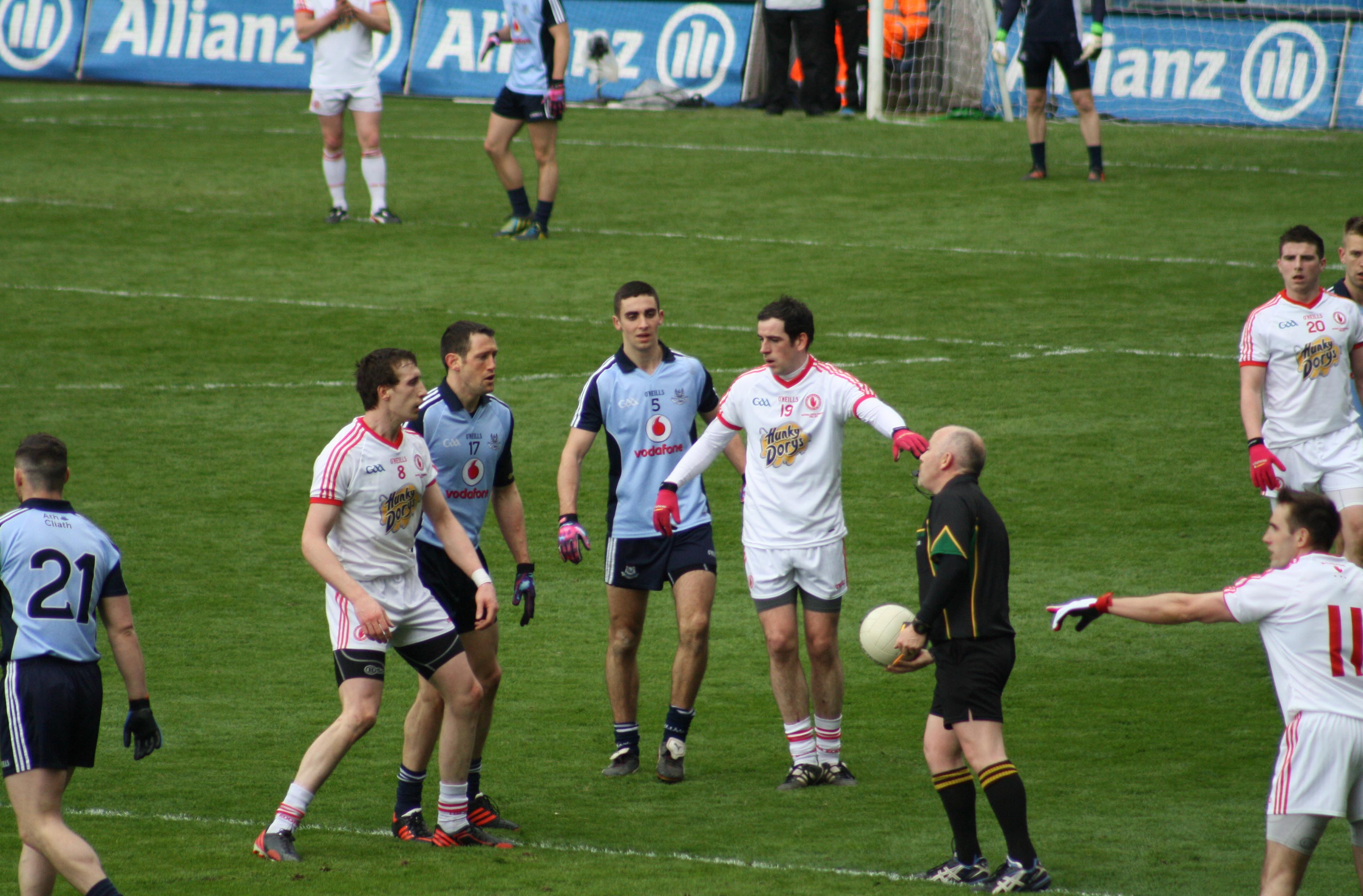
A league game between Dublin and Tyrone in 2013

In 1967, Australian journalist, broadcaster, and Victorian Football League (VFL) umpire Harry Beitzel, inspired by watching the 1966 All-Ireland senior football final on television, sent an Australian team known as the "Galahs" including South Melbourne's Bob Skilton, Richmond's Royce Hart, Carlton's Alex Jesaulenko and Melbourne and Carlton legend Ron Barassi as captain-coach – to play against Mayo and All-Ireland champions Meath, which was the first recorded major interaction between the two codes.

What then followed is the current International Rules Series between players of both codes and utilizing rules from both codes, which also gives them a chance to represent their country. The GAA chooses the team to represent Ireland, while the AFL chooses the team to represent Australia and has added a stipulation that each member of their team must have been named an All-Australian at least once. The two countries take turns hosting the series, and both countries' and sports' respective most prestigious venues – Croke Park and the Melbourne Cricket Ground (MCG) – have hosted series Tests. What is known as the Irish experiment also occurred, with Australian rules football clubs recruiting Gaelic football players. Irishmen who have distinguished themselves in both codes include Dublin's Jim Stynes – a 1984 minor All-Ireland football champion who became the 1991 Brownlow Medallist, a recipient of the Medal of the Order of Australia and a member of Melbourne's Team of the Century – and Kerry's Tadhg Kennelly, the first man to become both a senior All-Ireland football champion (2009) and an AFL Premiership player (2005 with Sydney, the Swans' first flag in 72 years).

== Rules ==
=== Overview ===
Players advance the football up the field with a combination of carrying, bouncing, kicking, hand-passing, and soloing (dropping the ball and then toe-kicking it upward into the hands). In the game, two types of scores are possible: points and goals. A point is awarded for kicking or hand-passing the ball over the crossbar, signalled by the umpire raising a white flag. A goal is awarded for kicking the ball under the crossbar into the net, signalled by the umpire raising a green flag. Positions in Gaelic football are similar to those in other football codes and comprise one goalkeeper, six backs, two midfielders, and six forwards, with a variable number of substitutes.

=== Playing field ===
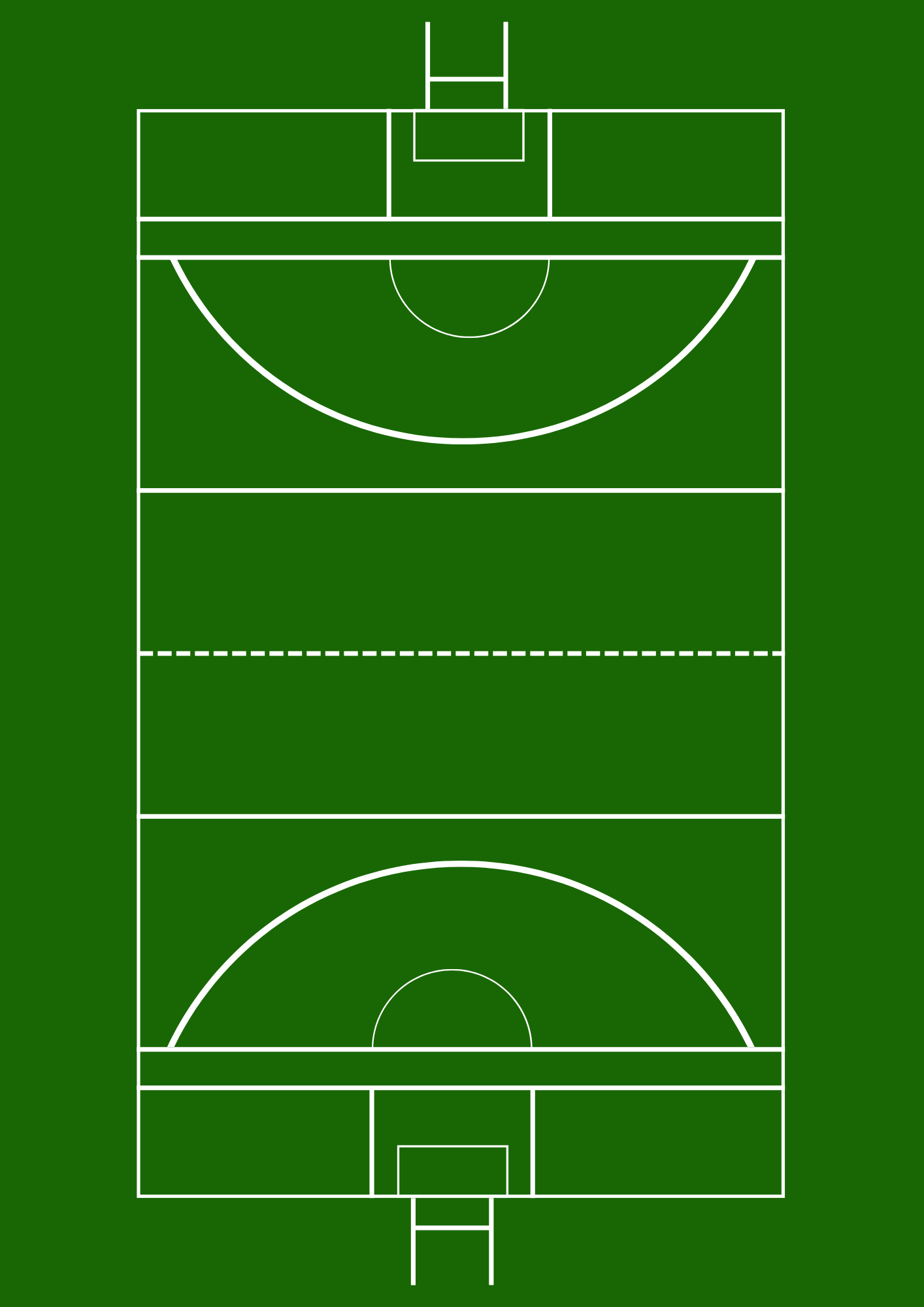
Diagram of a Gaelic football pitch since 2025. The FRC changes require significant changes to be made to the playing field.

A Gaelic pitch is similar in some respects to a rugby pitch but larger. The grass pitch is rectangular, stretching 130–145 metres (142–159 yards) long and 80–90 m (87–98 yd) wide. There are H-shaped goalposts at each end, formed by two posts, which are usually 6–7 metres (20–23 feet) high, set 6.5 m (21 ft) apart, and connected 2.5 m (8 ft 2 in) above the ground by a crossbar. A net extending behind the goal is attached to the crossbar and lower goalposts. The same pitch is used for hurling; the GAA, which organises both sports, decided this to facilitate dual usage. Lines are marked at distances of 13 metres (14 yd), 20 metres (22 yd), and 45 metres (49 yd) (65 metres or 71 yards in hurling) from each end-line. Shorter pitches and smaller goals are used by youth teams.

=== Duration ===
The majority of adult football and all minor and under-21 matches last for 60 minutes, divided into two halves of 30 minutes, except for senior inter-county games, which last for 70 minutes (two halves of 35 minutes). Draws are decided by replays or by playing 20 minutes of extra time (two halves of 10 minutes). Juniors have halves of 20 minutes or 25 minutes in some cases. Half-time intermission lasts from 5 to 15 minutes. Championship matches have a 30-minute intermission.

=== Teams ===
Teams consist of fifteen players (a goalkeeper, two corner backs, a full back, two wing backs, a centre back, two midfielders, two wing forwards, a centre forward, two corner forwards and a full forward) plus up to fifteen substitutes, of which six may be used. As for younger teams or teams that do not have enough players for fifteen a side, it is not uncommon to play thirteen a side (the same positions except without the full-back and the full forward). Each player is numbered 1–15, starting with the goalkeeper, who must wear a jersey colour different from that of his or her teammates. Up to 15 substitutes may be named on the team sheet, number 16 usually being the reserve goalkeeper.

=== Ball ===
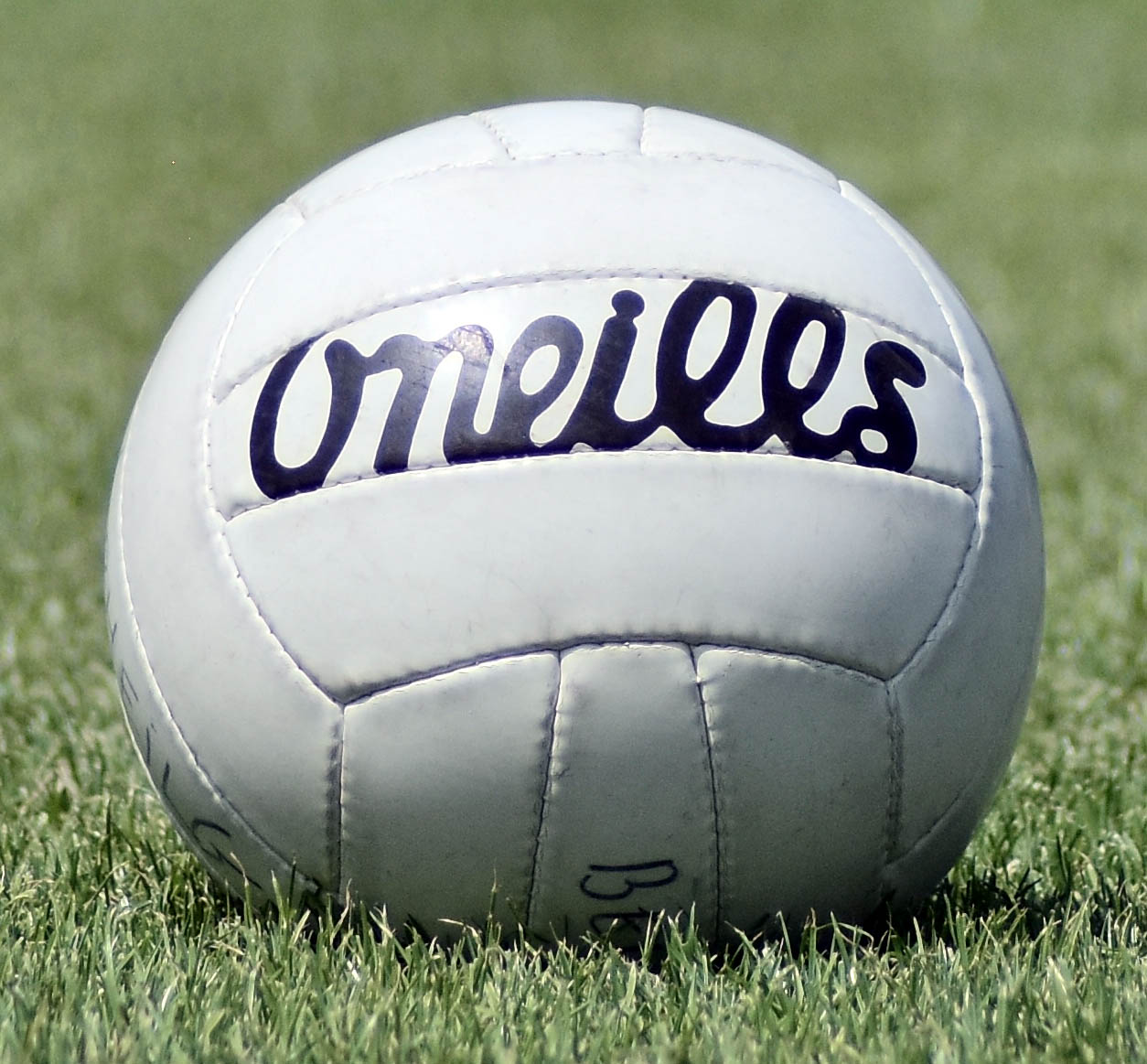
The ball used for a match, made by Irish company O'Neills

The game is played with a round leather football made of 18 stitched leather panels, with a circumference of 68–70 cm (27–27 1/2 in), weighing between 480 and 500 g (16 7/8 and 17 5/8 oz) when dry. It may be kicked or hand-passed. A hand pass is not a punch but rather a strike of the ball with the side of the closed fist, using the knuckle of the thumb.

==== Mark ====
In 2017, the GAA introduced the 'mark' across the board in Gaelic football. Similar to the mark in Australian rules football, a player who catches the ball from a kick-out is awarded a free kick. The rule in full states: "When a player catches the ball cleanly from a Kick-Out without it touching the ground, on or past the 45-metre (49 yd) line nearest the Kick-Out point, he shall be awarded 'a Mark' by the Referee. The player awarded a 'Mark' shall have the options of (a) Taking a free kick or (b) Playing on immediately." In comparison, the Australian rules equivalent requires the ball not to have touched the ground and for the kick to have travelled at least 15 metres (16 yd). In the experimental rules of 2019, a player can now also call a mark inside the opposition's 45-metre (49 yd) line after a clean catch from a kick played over 20 metres (22 yd) from outside the 45-metre (49 yd) line that does not touch the ground or any other player.

In 2020, additional versions of the mark came into force in Gaelic football. The advanced mark allowed a ball to be fielded cleanly inside the opposition 45 when kicked forward over a distance greater than 20 metres (22 yd) from outside the opposition 45. The referee is required to blow the whistle as this occurs, at which point the player has the option to take the mark or play on.

There is also a defensive mark, which a defender can get from a long ball played into him.

=== Types of fouls ===
There are three main types of fouls in Gaelic football, which can result in the ball being given to the other team, a player being cautioned, a player being removed from the field, or even the game being terminated.

==== Technical fouls ====
The following are considered technical fouls ("fouling the ball"):

- Going five steps without releasing, bouncing, or soloing the ball (soloing involves kicking the ball into one's own hands)
- Bouncing the ball twice in a row (It may be soloed continuously)
- Changing hands: Throwing the ball between the hands (legal in the ladies' game)
- Throwing the ball (it may be "hand-passed" by striking with the fist).
- Hand passing a goal. To hand pass a ball with an open palm there must be a clear striking action (the ball may be punched over the bar from up in the air, but not into the goal).
- Picking the ball directly off the ground (it must be scooped up into the hands by the foot). However, in ladies' Gaelic football, the ball may be picked up directly.
- The square ball is an often controversial rule: "If at the moment the ball enters the small square, there is already an attacking player inside the small rectangle, then a free out is awarded." As of 2012 square balls are only counted if the player is inside the square when the ball is kicked from a free or set piece. An opposing player is allowed in the square during open play.

==== Aggressive fouls ====
Aggressive fouls are physical or verbal fouls committed by a player against an opponent or the referee. The player can be cautioned (shown a yellow card), ordered off the pitch without a substitute (red card), or (as of January 2020) ejected from the match to the Sin Bin, where they must remain for ten minutes before returning to the field (black card). Picking up two black cards risks a red card, and the substitute will serve out whatever time imposed by officials.

Players are cautioned by a yellow card, ordered off the pitch without a substitute by a red card, or sent to the Sin Bin for ten minutes by a black card.

==== Dissent ====
A dissent foul is a foul where a player fails to comply with the officials' judgment or instructions. The player can be cautioned (shown a yellow card), ordered off the pitch without a substitute (red card), the free kick placement moved 13 m (14 yd) further down-field, or in certain circumstances, the game can be terminated. The following are considered dissent fouls:

- To challenge the authority of a referee, umpire, linesman, or sideline official.
- To fail to comply with a referee's instruction to use an orifice guard.
- To refuse to leave the field of play, on the instruction of the referee, for attention, after an injury involving bleeding.
- To show dissent with the referee's decision to award a free kick to the opposing team.
- To refuse to leave the field of play when ordered off (red card) or rejoin the game after being ordered off.
- A team or player(s) leaving the field without the referee's permission or refusing to continue playing.

=== Scoring ===
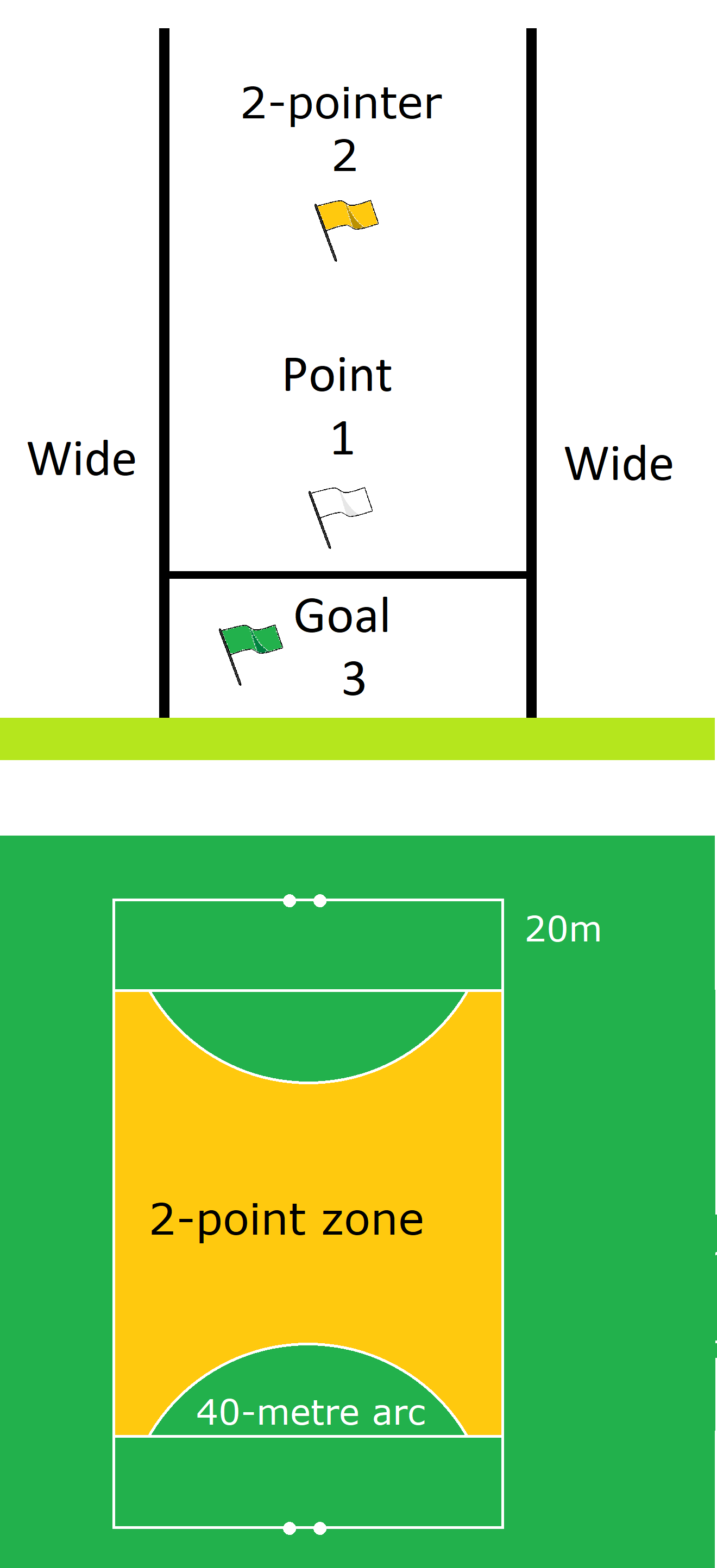
The new scoring system in Gaelic football — when the ball is kicked over the crossbar from outside the 20-metre line and outside a 40-metre arc, 2 points are scored.

If the ball goes over the crossbar, a point is scored and a white flag is raised by an umpire. A point is scored by either kicking the ball over the crossbar or fisting it over, in which case the hand must be closed while striking the ball. If the ball goes below the crossbar, a goal, worth three points, is scored, and a green flag is raised by an umpire. A goal is scored by kicking the ball into the net, not by fist-passing the ball into it. However, a player can strike the ball into the net with a closed fist if the ball was played to him by another player or came in contact with the post/crossbar/ground before connection. The goal is guarded by a goalkeeper. Scores are recorded in the format Goal Total-Point Total. To determine the score-line goals must be converted to points and added to the other points. For example, in a match with a final score of Team A 0–21 and Team B 4–8, Team A is the winner with 21 points, as Team B scored only 20 points (4 times 3, plus 8).

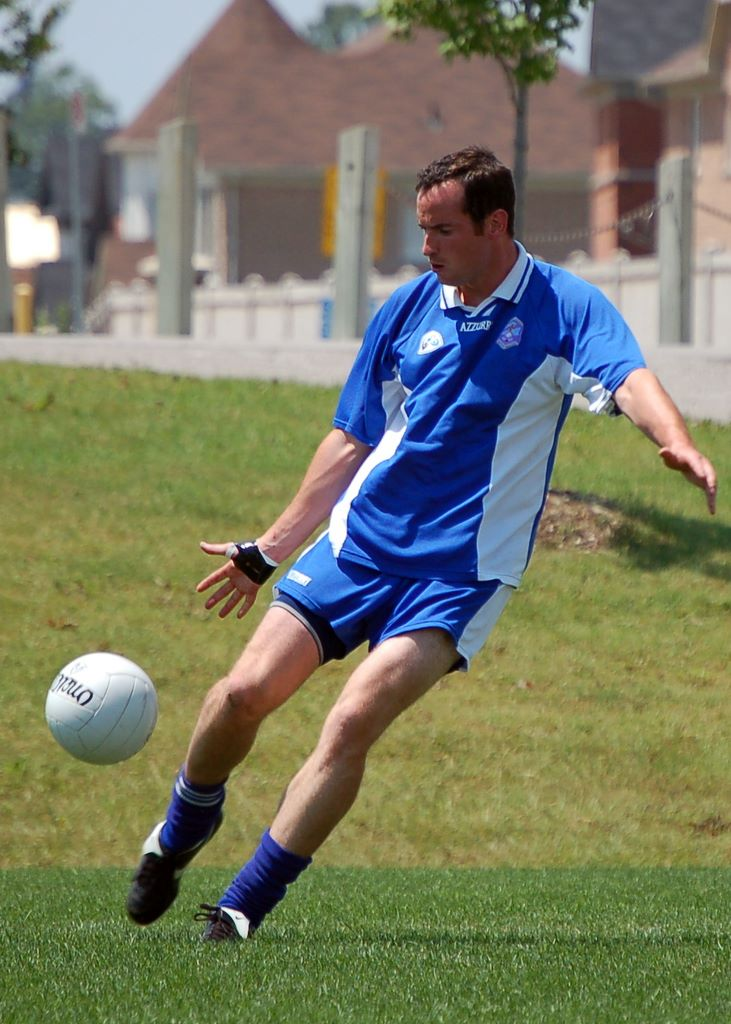
A player from a Canada GAA club shoots for goal

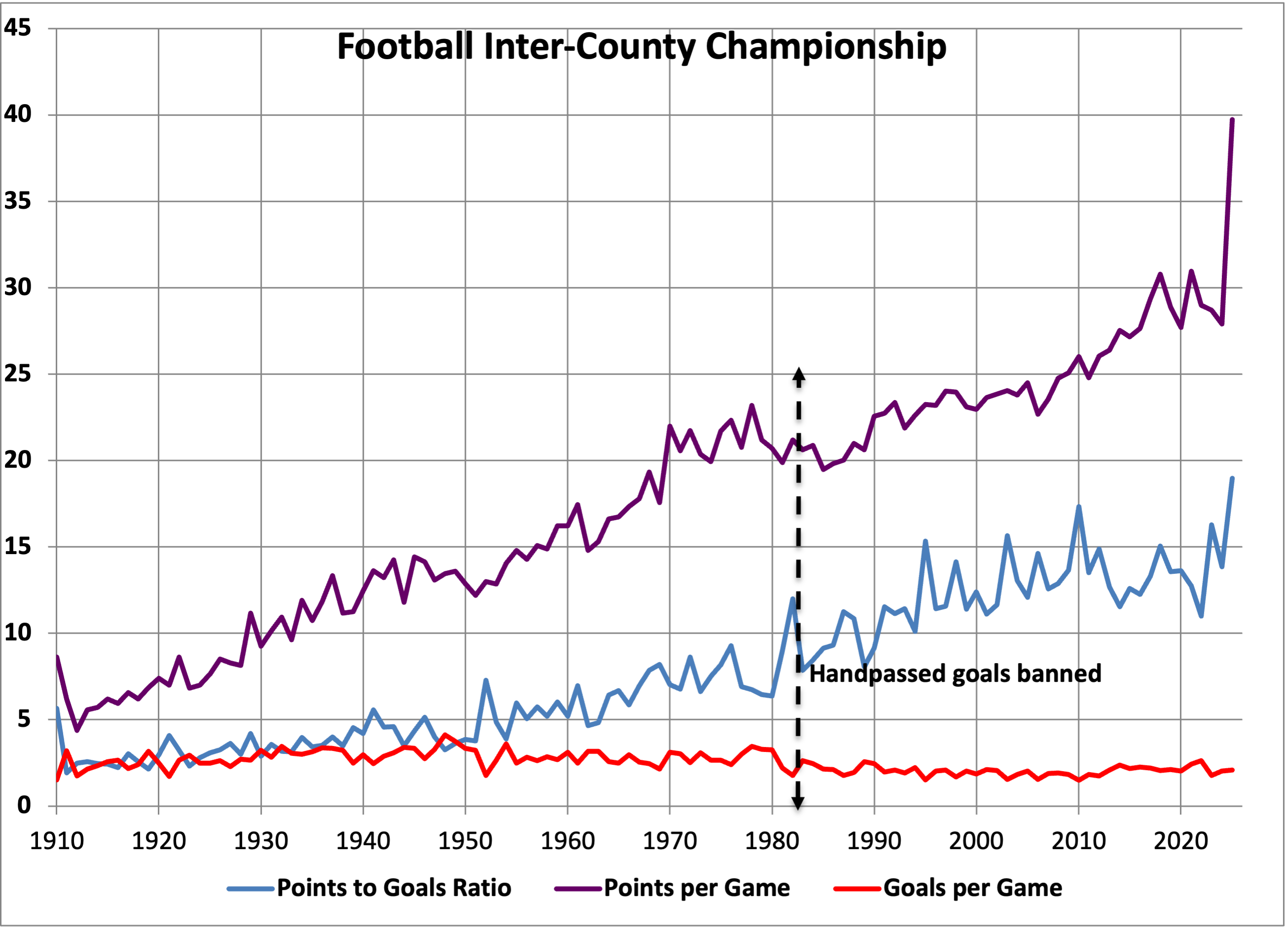
Football scoring to 2026

=== Tackling ===
The level of tackling allowed is less robust than in rugby or Australian rules.

Shoulder-to-shoulder contact and slapping the ball out of an opponent's hand are permitted, but the following are all fouls:

- Blocking a shot with the foot
- Pulling an opponent's jersey
- Pushing an opponent
- Sliding tackles
- Striking an opponent
- Touching the goalkeeper when he/she is inside the small rectangle
- Tripping
- Using both hands to tackle
- Wrestling the ball from an opponent's hands

=== Restarting play ===
- A match begins with the referee throwing the ball up between the four mid-fielders.
- After an attacker has put the ball wide of the goals or scored a point or a goal, the goalkeeper may take a kick out from the ground at the 13-metre (14 yd) line. All players must be beyond the 20-metre (22 yd) line. However, in the 2019 experimental rules (rules tested in pre-season competitions), kick-outs must be taken from the 20-metre (22 yd) line.
- After a defender has put the ball wide of the goals, an attacker may take a "45" from the ground on the 45-metre (49 yd) line, level with where the ball went wide.
- After a player has put the ball over the sideline, the other team may take a sideline kick at the point where the ball left the pitch. It may be kicked from the ground or the hands. The player who is taking the sideline kick must not pass the boundary line while taking it.
- After a player has committed a foul, the other team may take a free kick (usually shortened to "free" in reports/commentaries) at the point where the foul was committed. It may be kicked from the ground or the hands.
- If a player has been fouled while passing the ball, the free may be taken from the point where the ball landed.
- After a defender has committed a foul inside the large rectangle, the other team may take a penalty kick from the ground from the centre of the 11-metre (12 yd) line. Only the goalkeeper may guard the goals.
- If many players are struggling for the ball and it is unclear who was fouled first, the referee may throw the ball up between two opposing players.

=== Officials ===
A football match is overseen by up to eight officials:

- The referee
- Two linesmen
- Sideline official/Standby linesman (often referred to as "fourth official"; inter-county games only)
- Four umpires (two at each goal)

The referee is responsible for starting and stopping play, recording the score, awarding frees, and booking, and sending off players.

Linesmen are responsible for indicating the direction of line balls to the referee.

The fourth official is responsible for overseeing substitutions and also indicating the amount of stoppage time (signalled to him by the referee) and the players substituted using an electronic board.

The umpires are responsible for judging the scoring. They indicate to the referee whether a shot was: wide (spread both arms), a 45-metre (49 yd) kick (raise one arm), a point (wave white flag), a square ball (cross arms) or a goal (wave green flag). A disallowed score is indicated by crossing the green and white flags.

Other officials are not obliged to indicate any misdemeanours to the referee; they are only permitted to inform the referee of violent conduct they have witnessed that has occurred without the referee's knowledge. A linesman/umpire is not permitted to inform the referee of technical fouls such as a "double bounce" or an illegal pick-up of the ball. Such decisions can only be made at the discretion of the referee.

== 2025 rule changes ==
The GAA held a special congress in November 2024 to consider recommendations of the Football Review Committee. The FRC, led by Jim Gavin, made wide-ranging proposals that altered a number of rule areas.

The rule changes broadly cover nine areas, seven of which are directly related to gameplay. A new 40-metre scoring arc has been introduced. Points scored from outside this arc are now worth two points, incentivising long-range shooting. Teams are required to maintain at least three players in both their attacking and defensive halves at all times.

Kick-outs must now travel beyond the 40-metre arc, encouraging longer restarts and minimising short-passing strategies that can slow the game. Goalkeepers are limited in their movements; they can only receive the ball in the opposition half under specific conditions. This change aims to prevent goalkeepers from participating excessively in outfield play. An advanced mark is awarded for clean catches from kick passes that travel over 20 metres into the opposition's 45-metre area, encouraging high-fielding and long kicking.

Players fouled while in possession can opt to continue playing immediately without waiting for the referee's whistle, promoting uninterrupted play. There are additional punishments for dissent, deliberate fouling and cynical play, including an increased number of black card offences and the ball being advanced 50 metres (long a feature in Australian football) when unsportsmanlike conduct, such as not directly giving the ball to a fouled player, occurs after a foul is called.

Minor amendments to the new rules were recommended by the Football Review Committee, for use in the two remaining league rounds of the 2025 National Football League.

In October 2025 a GAA Special Congress formalised the rule changes by adopting them permanently. Minor alterations were made, such as all converted shots from outside the 40-metre arc count as two-point scores provided no other player from the same team as the shooter touches it after it's kicked.

== Team of the Century ==
The Team of the Century was nominated in 1984 by Sunday Independent readers and selected by a panel of experts including journalists and former players. It was not chosen as part of the Gaelic Athletic Association's centenary year celebrations. The goal was to single out the best 15 players who had played the game in their respective positions. Naturally, many of the selections were hotly debated by fans around the country.

	Goalkeeper
	Dan O'Keeffe (Kerry)
Right corner back	Full back	Left corner back
Enda Colleran (Galway)	Paddy O'Brien (Meath)	Seán Flanagan (Mayo)
Right half back	Centre back	Left half back
Sean Murphy (Kerry)	John Joe O'Reilly (Cavan)	Stephen White (Louth)
	Midfield
Mick O'Connell (Kerry)		Jack O'Shea (Kerry)
Right half forward	Centre forward	Left half forward
Seán O'Neill (Down)	Seán Purcell (Galway)	Pat Spillane (Kerry)
Right corner forward	Full forward	Left corner forward
Mikey Sheehy (Kerry)	Tommy Langan (Mayo)	Kevin Heffernan (Dublin)

== Team of the Millennium ==
The Team of the Millennium was a team chosen in 1999 by a panel of GAA past presidents and journalists. The goal was to single out the best 15 players who had played the game in their respective positions, since the foundation of the GAA in 1884 up to the Millennium year, 2000. Naturally, many of the selections were hotly debated by fans around the country.

	Goalkeeper
	Dan O'Keeffe (Kerry)
Right corner back	Full back	Left corner back
Enda Colleran (Galway)	Joe Keohane (Kerry)	Seán Flanagan (Mayo)
Right half back	Centre back	Left half back
Seán Murphy (Kerry)	John Joe O'Reilly (Cavan)	Martin O'Connell (Meath)
	Midfield
Mick O'Connell (Kerry)		Tommy Murphy (Laois)
Right half forward	Centre forward	Left half forward
Seán O'Neill (Down)	Seán Purcell (Galway)	Pat Spillane (Kerry)
Right corner forward	Full forward	Left corner forward
Mikey Sheehy (Kerry)	Tommy Langan (Mayo)	Kevin Heffernan (Dublin)

== Competition structure ==
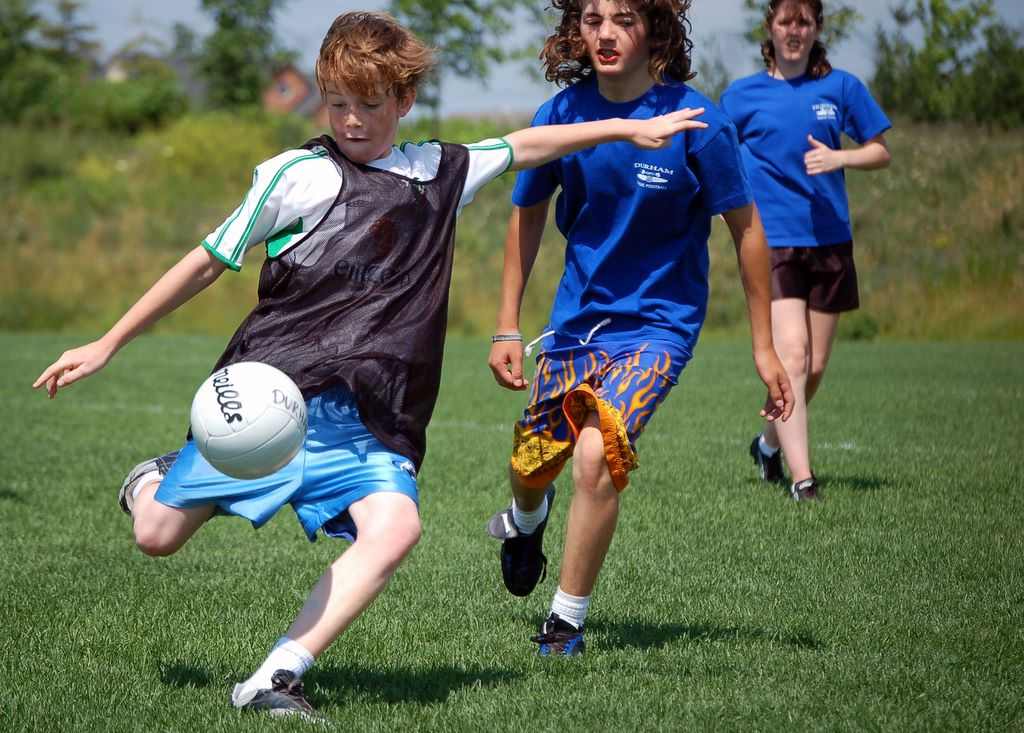
Children participating in a game of Gaelic football

Gaelic sports at all levels are amateur, in the sense that the athletes, even those playing at an elite level, do not receive payment for their performance.

The main competitions at all levels of Gaelic football are the League and the Championship. Of these, it is the Championship (a knock-out tournament) that tends to attain the most prestige.

The basic unit of each game is organised at the club level, which is usually arranged on a parochial basis. Local clubs compete against other clubs in their county intending to win the County Club Championship at senior, junior, or intermediate levels (for adults) or under-21, minor or under-age levels (for children). A club may field more than one team, for example, a club may field a team at the senior level and a "seconds" team at a junior or intermediate level. This format is laid out in the table below:

Adult levels
Name	Description
Senior	The top tier for clubs, promotion from intermediate
Intermediate	The second tier, promotion from junior and relegation from senior
Junior	The third tier, relegation from intermediate

Non-adult levels
Name	Description
Under-21	Contested by players under the age of 21
Minor	Contested by players under the age of 18 (Under 17 for inter county)
Under-age	Contested by players of all ages between under-17 and under-6

Clubs may come together in districts for the County Championship or compete on their own.

Though the island of Ireland was partitioned between two states by the British parliament in 1920, the organisation of Gaelic games (like that of most cultural organisations and religions) continues on an All-Ireland basis. At the national level, Ireland's Gaelic games are organised in 32 GAA counties, most of which are identical in name and extent to the 32 administrative counties on which local government throughout the island was based until the late 20th century. The term "county" is also used for some overseas GAA places, such as London and New York. Clubs are also located throughout the world, in other parts of the United States, in Great Britain, in Canada, in Asia, in Australasia and continental Europe.

The level at which county teams compete against each other is referred to as inter-county (i.e. similar to international). A county panel—a team of 15 players, plus a similar number of substitutes—is formed from the best players playing at the club level in each county. The most prestigious inter-county competition in Gaelic football is the All-Ireland Championship. The highest-level national championship is called the All-Ireland Senior Football Championship. Nearly all counties contest this tournament on an annual basis, with crowds of people thronging venues the length and breadth of Ireland—the most famous of these stadiums being Croke Park—to support their local county team, a team comprising players selected from the clubs in that county. These modified knock-out games start as provincial championships contested by counties against other counties in their respective province, the four Irish provinces of Ulster, Munster, Leinster and Connacht. The four victors in these then progress automatically to the All-Ireland series.

In the past, the team winning each provincial championship would play one of the others, at a stage known as the All-Ireland semi-finals, with the winning team from each game playing each other in the famed All-Ireland Final to determine the outright winner. A recent (the 1990s/2000s) re-organisation created a "back door" method of qualifying, with teams knocked out during the provincial rounds of the All-Ireland Championship now acquiring a second chance at glory. Now the four victorious teams at the provincial level enter the recently created All-Ireland quarter-finals instead, where they compete against the four remaining teams from the All-Ireland Qualifiers to progress to the All-Ireland semi-finals and then the All-Ireland Final. This re-organisation means that one team may defeat another team in an early stage of the championship, yet be defeated and knocked out of the tournament by the same team at a later stage. It also means a team may be defeated in an early stage of the championship, yet be crowned All-Ireland champions—as Tyrone was in 2005 and 2008.

The secondary competition at the inter-county level is the National League. The National Football League is held every spring and groups counties into four divisions according to their relative strength. As at local (county) levels of Gaelic football, the League at a national level is less prestigious than the Championship—however, in recent years attendances have grown, as has interest from the public and players. This is due in part to the 2002 adoption of a February–April timetable, in place of the former November start, as well as the provision of Division 2 final stages. Live matches are aired on the international channel Setanta Sports and the Irish language channel TG4, with highlights shown on RTÉ Two.

There are also All-Ireland championships for county teams at Junior, Under-21 and Minor levels, and provincial and national club championships, contested by the teams that win their respective county championships.

== See also ==
- All-Ireland Senior Football Championship
- All-Ireland Sevens Football
- Ladies' Gaelic football
- List of footballers (Gaelic football)
- List of Gaelic football clubs
- Sport in Ireland
- Comparison of Gaelic football and Australian rules football
- Comparison of Gaelic football and rugby union
- Association football in Northern Ireland
- Association football in the Republic of Ireland
