= Hurling at the 1904 Summer Olympics =

Hurling at the Games of the III Olympiad
- Dates: 21 July 1904

Medalists
1st place, gold medalist(s)		Innisfail Hurling Club; United States

Hurling was featured in the Summer Olympic Games unofficial programme in 1904. The competition was won by Innisfail Hurling Club of host city St. Louis, Missouri who played a match on 21 July 1904.

== Aftermath ==
Hurling was showcased at the Château de Vincennes during the 2024 Summer Olympics in Paris, the first time it had featured at an Olympics since 1904.
