= Henry Dixon (Irish republican) =

Irish republican, a founding member of Sinn Féin

Henry Dixon (1859 – 4 December 1928) was an Irish republican. He was a member of several nineteenth-century nationalist societies, a founding member of Sinn Féin, and a director of the Sinn Féin Printing & Publishing Company.

Dixon was a member of the Dublin branch of the Young Ireland Society (YIS), a literary and political organisation founded in 1881 to encourage political debate among Irish nationalists. Its members included Fred Allan, John MacBride and John Wyse Power, and it contained a strong element from the Irish Republican Brotherhood (IRB), a revolutionary secret society. In the spring of 1885 he gave a lecture to the Society on the need to protect Irish industry. About this time Dixon met Arthur Griffith, and the two became lifelong friends. The Dublin YIS foundered after 1886, and in 1887, when Fred Allan founded the National Club, a social club, with IRB money, Dixon ran the club's Literary Society with Patrick Lavelle. Both Dixon and Lavelle were IRB members.

Dixon joined the Parnell Leadership Committee, established in December 1890 at the National Club to create an alliance between local government officials across the country to consolidate the support base of Charles Stuart Parnell following the divorce scandal, and was on the executive of the associated Parnell Leadership Fund, whose purpose was to raise money to maintain a Parnellite presence in the press, with Allan and Wyse Power. In 1891, the National Club Literary Society, which had been active on the Parnellite side throughout the crisis, called on nationalist literary and political societies to unite under a single body, and in September that year the Young Ireland League (YIL) was formed. Dixon was on the executive of the YIL with MacBride and Lavelle; they organised republican commemorative events, including those of the National Monuments Committee, in Dublin. During this period Dixon wrote political letters to the radical Belfast newspaper, the Northern Patriot. When, in 1896, a provisional committee was set up to celebrate the centenary of the 1798 Rebellion, Dixon, Lavelle, and Allan were members.

Dixon was active in the Celtic Literary Society, run by William Rooney, of which Arthur Griffith was also a member. He was an early contributor to Rooney and Griffith's newspaper, the United Irishman (started 1899), and a founding member, with Griffith, of the Sinn Féin organisation in 1905. When Griffith closed down the United Irishman in 1906, and formed the Sinn Féin Printing & Publishing Company to publish its successor, Sinn Féin, Dixon was one of the directors of the company. He remained politically and personally close to Griffith for the remainder of Griffith's life. Dixon, Griffith and John MacBride met for lunch on a daily basis in a Dublin restaurant owned by John Wyse Power and his wife Jennie. When MacBride was sued for divorce by Maud Gonne, his wife of two years, Dixon, although also a friend of Gonne's, swore an affidavit in support of MacBride.

Dixon was one of the hundreds of nationalists arrested in the wake of the Easter Rising in 1916. He was interned initially at Frongoch, but being considered "a dangerous leader" he was transferred to Reading. While at Frongoch, he acted as camp librarian, befriended the future republican leader Michael Collins, and wrote to the Archbishop of Dublin, William Walsh, to complain about the lack of religious services at the camp. Walsh was able to arrange for a chaplain to be appointed. Dixon was released in December 1916. His daughter Bríd was involved in the Rising, but escaped arrest. During the War of Independence Dixon was again arrested and interned at Ballykinlar.

For most of his life, Dixon was a law clerk with a firm of Dublin solicitors. According to one of his fellow internees at Frongoch, he "could have been a famous lawyer, but he refused to take whatever oath or declaration then imposed on lawyers...and was content to be employed as a clerk in a law office." In 1921 he became manager of his son's solicitors firm. He was also active in the Society of Saint Vincent de Paul.

Dixon died after being struck by a car as he left his office in Dublin on 4 December 1928, aged 69.
