= Sinn Féin (disambiguation) =

Sinn Féin is an Irish political party.

Sinn Féin may also refer to:

- Sinn Féin (slogan), a slogan used by Irish nationalists in the late 19th and early 20th centuries
- Sinn Féin the Workers Party, former name of the Workers' Party (Ireland)
- Sinn Féin Printing & Publishing Company, a publishing company founded by Arthur Griffith
- Sinn Féin (newspaper), a newspaper published by the above
- Republican Sinn Féin, a minor political party

== See also ==
- History of Sinn Féin
