= Orders, decorations, and medals of the Republic of Ireland =

Ireland has no formal honours system. Proposals to introduce one have been made by various groups at different times. The Order of St. Patrick, established by the British monarchy in the Kingdom of Ireland in 1783, has been in abeyance for decades. The Constitution of Ireland mandates that "Titles of nobility shall not be conferred by the State", and honours are not issued directly by the Government of Ireland.

As with military and police forces in other jurisdictions, medals and decorations are issued by the Irish Defence Forces and Garda Síochána, including for distinguished service, operational service, long service, and commemorative purposes. Service and commemorative medals are also issued by civilian and volunteer groups.

== History ==
=== Debates and proposals ===
==== Up to independence ====
Irish republicans were opposed to the British honours system from both Irish nationalist antipathy to its Britishness and republican opposition to its monarchist underpinnings. The Act of Union 1800's passage through the Parliament of Ireland was, notoriously, helped by the offer to legislators of British and Irish peerages and other honours; the 1783 introduction of the Order of St. Patrick was a similar source of patronage and compliance.

Article 5 of the 1922 Constitution of the Irish Free State read:

No title of honour in respect of any services rendered in or in relation to the Irish Free State (Saorstát Éireann) may be conferred on any citizen of the Irish Free State (Saorstát Éireann) except with the approval or upon the advice of the Executive Council of the State.

The original draft prepared for the Provisional Government had stated more baldly, "No title of honour may be conferred by the State on any citizen of Saorstát Éireann", but the British insisted on adding the exception in order to preserve a theoretical royal prerogative. Geoffrey Browne, 3rd Baron Oranmore and Browne felt that even the revised wording "ought not to have been considered by either House [at Westminster] until a gracious Message had been received from the Sovereign stating that he placed at the disposal of the House his rights with respect to the conferring of honours".

In addition to a ban on new titles, the drafting committee had envisaged a phasing-out of existing peerage titles, but the Provisional Government removed that to conciliate southern unionists such as Lord Midleton. In the debate on Article 5 in the Third Dáil/Provisional Parliament, (Note: Dáil 25 September 1922 p.12) Darrell Figgis proposed an absolute prohibition, alluding to the contemporary scandal surrounding the sale of British peerages. Kevin O'Higgins countered:

You cannot set down, I submit, having regard to the exact position under the Treaty statement, a prohibition on the British King from conferring honours in this country, but they have conceded that they will not confer except upon the advice and with the consent of the Executive Council, which in practice can be made equivalent to a complete prohibition[.]

==== Irish Free State ====
The Free State was established on 6 December 1922 as a Dominion, with a Governor-General representing the British king in his capacity as Free State monarch. Article 5 of the Constitution was called into question when The London Gazette's list of the UK's 1925 New Year Honours included "Thomas Francis Molony formerly Lord Chief Justice of Ireland" and "James O'Connor, formerly a Lord Justice of Appeal in Ireland", positions they held until abolished in 1924. In answer to a parliamentary question, W. T. Cosgrave said their honours were "not conferred in respect of services rendered in or in relation to Saorstát Eireann". (Note: Dáil 3 February 1925 v10 p2 c1)

In December 1929, Ernest Blythe proposed establishing a "Legion of Saint Patrick", with Members, Officers, and Commanders. The Legion's establishment and constituent Statutes would be made by the King under letters patent; the Governor-General would be Head of the Legion during his term of office and a Commander thereafter. The investiture of new members with the Cross of the Legion would occur annually on 6 December. In July 1930 the Cumann na nGaedheal government considered draft letters patent drawn up by the Department of External Affairs and agreed to make informal talks with the British Government; no further action ensued.

The 1932 general election returned a Fianna Fáil government "strongly opposed to the establishment of any decoration or order". Before the 1932 Eucharistic Congress opened in Dublin, Charles Bewley, Irish ambassador to the Holy See, warned that offence would be taken if no honour were conferred on the papal legate who would open the conference, Lorenzo Lauri. The government did not alter its policy, although its overall support for the Congress satisfied the Vatican.

==== Order of St Patrick ====
Between April 1924 and December 1926 seven knights of the Order of St. Patrick died. The British government felt obliged, before filling the accrued vacancies, to consult the Free State's Executive Council. Bernard Forbes, 8th Earl of Granard, a member of both the Order and the Free State Senate, raised the matter, and John A. Costello, the Attorney-General, advised the Executive Council that in light of the 1926 Imperial Conference the Order was an Irish competence; in 1928 the Council decided "that the Order, being now moribund, should be allowed completely to disappear". While monarchs continued to appoint members of the British royal family to the Order in the 1930s, no other appointments were made, and the last Knight died in 1974. Éamon de Valera and Seán Lemass both considered reviving the Order, with Lemass allowing Brian Lenihan to float the idea in 1960, although Fine Gael was opposed. After the Northern Ireland peace process and the Belfast Agreement, media reported suggestions that the Order be awarded jointly by the President of Ireland and the British monarch in recognition of work to improve British–Irish relations. This received support from journalists Jim Duffy and Mary Kenny.

==== 1937 Constitution ====
Article 40, section 2 of the Constitution states in full:

1° Titles of nobility shall not be conferred by the State.

2° No title of nobility or of honour may be accepted by any citizen except with the prior approval of the Government.

The draft Constitution introduced to the Dáil in 1937 originally included a second sentence in subsection 1°:

1° Titles of nobility shall not be conferred by the State. Orders of Merit may, however be created.

In the committee stage, the whole of section 2 was proposed for deletion by Frank MacDermot. (Note: Dáil 2 June 1937 p.19 cc.1617–30) He and William Norton expressed opposition to an Order of Merit, and suggested that the French Legion of Honour was used to reward political cronies. Éamon de Valera, the President of the Executive Council and chief architect of the Constitution, responded:

If the State were anxious to confer an order indicating a certain standard of excellence or performance in science, literature or art, I should be slow to debar it from the start and say that under no circumstances should a recognition of special service be possible by the State. If I am assured it is not necessary, I shall be only too glad to omit the provision, as I should be glad to omit the whole thing if there was any reason for doing so.

At recommittal the following week, de Valera proposed the deletion of the second sentence of Article 40.2.1°, which was agreed. (Note: Dáil 9 June 1937 p.17 c.183)

==== Genealogical Office ====
The Ulster King of Arms continued to issue grants of arms across all Ireland until 1943, when the functions of the office were taken over by the Norroy King of Arms and restricted to Northern Ireland. In the Republic from 1943 the Chief Herald of Ireland has been part of the Genealogical Office and continues to grant arms to individuals and corporate persons. Until 2003 the office also recognised Chiefs of the Name as senior known patrilineal descendant of a clan chief in medieval Gaelic Ireland. This was discontinued in 2003 after irregularities in the process were publicised; the Herald's announcement stated:

Courtesy recognition was intended to amount to nothing more than the recognition of a genealogical fact (ie that the individual concerned was the most senior known male descendant of the last inaugurated or de facto chief of a particular name in power around the end of the sixteenth century) and was not intended to confer, confirm or imply any rights in law, or any special status or title of nobility or of honour.

==== Oireachtas and government ====
In 1998, the All-Party Oireachtas Committee on the Constitution noted that the question of a state honours system had "been raised in a desultory manner by governments since 1930". Dáil questions were asked by Patrick O'Donnell in 1954; (Note: Dáil 22 April 1954 p.3) Seán Moore in 1976 (Note: Dáil 21 January 1976 p.4) and 1981; (Note: Dáil 20 October 1981 p.3) Michael O'Leary in 1981; (Note: Dáil 11 February 1981 p.7) Gay Mitchell in 1986; (Note: Dáil 4 November 1986 p.4) Bernard Durkan in June (Note: Dáil 29 June 1988 p.14) and October 1988, (Note: Dáil 25 October 1988 p.4) 1991, (Note: Dáil 18 June 1991 p.3) February (Note: Dáil 25 February 1992 p.6) and July 1992, (Note: Dáil 8 July 1992 p.77) and 1994; (Note: Dáil 2 March 1994 p.8) and Michael Bell in 1991. (Note: Dáil 19 February 1991 p.4) The usual response was that all-party consensus was not forthcoming. In 1986, Taoiseach Garret FitzGerald suggested the party whips might discuss the issue. The Department of the Taoiseach file on Bell's question, released in 2021 under the thirty-year rule, pointed out that Bob Geldof, a prominent Irish recipient of an honorary British KBE, had derided the idea of an Irish honours system, and that there was widespread public suspicion that politicians would abuse any honours system to reward cronies.

The Gaisce President's Award scheme for young people was established in 1985 by the Fine Gael–Labour government, based on a pilot scheme introduced in 1982 by the previous Fianna Fáil government. Charles Haughey stated: (Note: Dáil 31 October 1985 p.22)

We had hoped that if successful it would lead to the solution of another problem, namely, the problem of some honours system in this State which has so far lamentably failed to get off the ground under any Government. We thought that if this award scheme for young people could be launched and got under way in a totally constructive, non-partisan, non-political atmosphere, it would serve as a headline to be followed on a broader scene. Unfortunately it was not to be.

Garret FitzGerald denied the allegation that the Gaisce committee was party-biased. In 1988, after Haughey had returned to power, he stated "As indicated previously in this House, the matter of an honours system is not under consideration".

==== 1998–99 ====
The Oireachtas Committee on the Constitution's 1998 report recommended that the President be empowered to award honours after consultation with the Council of State. This would require a constitutional amendment, because although the Constitution allows the Oireachtas to grant extra powers to the President, these can only be exercised on the advice of the cabinet, as opposed to the Council of State. In June 1998, Ruairi Quinn said "opposition to an honours system in the past arose out of the sense that it conveyed some kind of quasi-aristocratic benediction on the recipient. However, we have now come of age and can examine it with the self-confidence of the time." (Note: Dáil 24 June 1998 p.20) In December 1998, (Note: Dáil 8 December 1998 p.4) Ruairi Quinn asked "Does the Taoiseach share a concern which seems to form part of the thinking behind the recommendations in the committee's report that politicians cannot be trusted with the allocation of any kind of honours system?" to which Bertie Ahern responded, "I presume the thinking is to refer the matter to the Council of State. We do not have to do that given that in every other area the President acts on the advice of the Executive, the Executive takes the advice of the House." In 1999, the Department of the Taoiseach drew up a discussion document which Ahern circulated in September to Fine Gael and Labour. (Note: Dáil 19 May 1999 p.6) In November discussions took place between party nominees: Séamus Brennan for Fianna Fáil, Maurice Manning for Fine Gael and Michael Ferris for Labour. (Note: Dáil 2 November 1999 p.4) The discussion paper, having examined other countries' systems, proposed the President bestowing a medal and parchment certificate on the recommendation of an independent panel. However, discussion broke down as Fianna Fáil wanted the government to be allowed to make recommendations, which the Opposition parties objected to on the basis that it would politicise the process.

==== 21st century ====
The issue has continued to crop up in the 2000s. In 2003, Bertie Ahern suggested that the Oireachtas Committee on Procedure and Privilege should set up a sub-committee chaired by the Minister for the Environment, Heritage and Local Government to examine the question. (Note: Sub-Committee on Seanad Reform 16 September 2003 p.8) Paul Connaughton Snr in 2004 (Note: Dáil 2 November 2004 p.153) and Dan Neville in 2005 (Note: Dáil 8 March 2005 p.57) raised the question of state honours for members of the Irish diaspora. Brian O'Shea recommended recognition for "people from the community voluntary sector". (Note: Joint Committee on Arts, Sport, Tourism, Community, Rural and Gaeltacht Affairs 2 March 2005 p.3) Finian McGrath raised the matter in 2006. (Note: Dáil 7 June 2006 p.91)

Bertie Ahern supported the idea of introducing an honours scheme in media interviews after golfer Pádraig Harrington had won the 2007 British Open. On 20 November, in response to Dáil questions, Ahern stated that any scheme would require cross-party consensus, that he had distributed a discussion paper in 1999, and that other party leaders had agreed to raise the question with their colleagues. (Note: Dáil 20 November 2007 p.3) Points raised in the discussion included the UK Cash for Honours scandal and the fear of actual or perceived political bias in deciding whom to honour. Further discussion on 12 December. (Note: Dáil 12 December 2007 p.4) In 2009 Finian McGrath asked for update on the matter; Brian Cowen said one party had not replied from 2007. (Note: Dáil 11 March 2009 p.67) A 2011 question produced a similar response. (Note: Dáil 12 January 2011 p.89)

In 2012, the government announced the Distinguished Service Award for the Irish Abroad and said it would "consider proposals for a similar mechanism for recognising the distinguished service of those resident within Ireland". In 2015, Senator Feargal Quinn introduced a private member's bill to establish an award called "Gradam an Uachtaráin", to be bestowed by the President on the nomination of an Awarding Council subject to the veto of the Government. The bill lapsed after the 2016 dissolution and election.

In 2023, a bill modelled on Quinn's was reintroduced in the Seanad by the Independent group and given qualified support on behalf of the Fine Gael–Fianna Fáil–Green government by junior minister Hildegarde Naughton.

=== Irish citizens receiving foreign awards ===
==== Titles ====
Article 40.2.2° of the Constitution states "No title of nobility or of honour may be accepted by any citizen except with the prior approval of the Government." In 1991, there was no record of any such request having been made. In the ten years to 2004, two people applied for permission: Tony O'Reilly for a British knighthood, and John F. Coyne for a Malaysian Panglima Jasa Negara. Both were approved. (Note: Dáil 25 February 2004 p.75) There were two requests in 2005, one in 2008, two in 2013 and two in 2014 by 1 July. (Note: Dáil 1 July 2014 Q.97) Between 9 March 2014 and 10 November 2015, approval was given for four UK knighthoods and one damehood, and to Anthony Bailey for the Order of Grenada; two Antigua and Barbuda Order of the Nation awards (one also to Bailey) had already been made when the government was informed; these were "noted" rather than approved, with the government emphasising that this prior approval ought to have been sought. (Note: Dáil 10 Nov 2015 p.89) O'Reilly and Bailey have dual citizenship of Ireland and the UK. The awards made to Bailey were subsequently rescinded but his website continues to imply that certain of his awards and decorations have been approved by the Irish Government. The cabinet considered six further awards, all from the UK, between 2016 and 2023: two were approved, including Louise Richardson, to whom President Michael D. Higgins later apologised for "clumsily calling out her title as dame of the British Empire". The other four had already been conferred, with Micheál Martin, the Minister for Foreign Affairs noting "No facility exists for retrospective approval by the Government in these instances and currently there are no penalties or other sanctions for failing to obtain prior approval of the Government".

Inheritors of foreign titles would not need the approval of the Government as they are incorporeal hereditaments. but neither are these officially recognised in Ireland although they may be used socially out of courtesy. Edward Pakenham, 6th Earl of Longford and Sir John Keane, 5th Baronet as members of the 5th Seanad were referred to in its official proceedings as "the Earl of Longford" and "Sir John Keane" respectively. (Note: Seanad 11 December 1946 p.5 cc.166–167)

==== Other foreign awards ====
Between 1980 and 1991 there were 175 inquiries from foreign governments about awarding decorations other than titles to Irish citizens. These do not fall within Article 40.2.2°, and the government raised no objections to any.

A 2005 article in the Sunday Times after The Corrs had accepted MBEs, noted an increase in the number of recent Irish recipients of British awards, naming Daniel O'Donnell, Niall Quinn, Pierce Brosnan, Pat Eddery, and Orla Guerin; observing "the more gongs the British send across the Irish Sea, the less likely it is that the issue [of an Irish honours system] will go away". In 2003, Michael Finucane had called for an Irish honours system when Christina Noble received an award from the Prince of Wales. The same year, Bertie Ahern said, "Irish people who achieve something significant in their walk of life must go to other jurisdictions to get their awards. That is wrong. An awards system should not be based on a system of monarchy or anything else. It is only an awards system."

Awards by other countries to Irish citizens include the U.S. Presidential Medal of Freedom to Mary Robinson in 2009, the French Legion of Honour to multiple people, and dynastic orders such as orders, decorations, and medals of the Holy See.

=== Limited awards ===
Some existing award schemes are run or supported by the state in Ireland and these include:

Honour	Notes
Aosdána / Saoi	Aosdána is a self-selecting group of up to 250 artists, of whom up to seven have the title Saoi
Comhairle na Míre Gaile	Recognising deeds of bravery to save life
Scott Medal	For Garda Síochána personnel
Military awards and decorations	For Defence Forces personnel
Michael Heffernan Memorial Award	Marine gallantry
Gaisce – The President's Award	Young people aged 15–25
Honorary citizenship	See list of honorary citizens of Ireland.

Other honours or distinctions have also been compared to honours systems:

Honour	Notes
Honorary degrees of Irish third level institutions	Mentioned by Mary Kenny and John Burns
Freedom of a city or town	Mentioned by Ruairi Quinn and John Burns. Noel Ahern specifically mentioned freedom of the City of Dublin. The Local Government Act 2001 authorises the continued award of such honours by local councils.
Depiction on a postage stamp	A spokeswoman for An Post said in 2010, "In a country like Ireland that doesn't have an honours system, being on a stamp is the highest honour the public can bestow." See List of people on stamps of Ireland.
Invitation to address the Oireachtas or Dáil Éireann	Noted by Ruairi Quinn. See list of addresses to the Oireachtas.
Honorary consuls	Bernard Durkan in 1994 suggested as an honour for Irish Americans.

Opposition politicians and others, in criticising actual or potential government appointments to the boards of public and state-sponsored bodies, have on occasion described the practice as a kind of ersatz honours system to reward party loyalists or personal friends of ministers. Such claims have been made by Pat Rabbitte, Gay Mitchell (in relation to the Office of Tobacco Control (Note: Select Committee on Health and Children 30 January 2002 p.3) and the Voluntary Health Insurance Board (Note: Select Committee on Health and Children 21 Mar 2001 p.3)), and Jim Mitchell (in relation to the National Treasury Management Agency (Note: Dáil 22 Jun 1990 p.5)) The analogy was rejected by ministers John O'Donoghue (in relation to Fáilte Ireland (Note: Seanad 3 December 2002 p.7)) and Micheál Martin.

Awards by private organisations include the People of the Year Awards and the Order of Clans of Ireland.

==== Volunteer and active citizenship awards ====
Several proposed awards relate to volunteerism or active citizenship which contributes to the local community. A 2005 review of the Fianna Fáil–Progressive Democrat government's programme proposed "National Volunteer Awards on the lines of the Gaisce Awards". The March 2007 report of the Taskforce on Active Citizenship chaired by Mary Davis said:

It is also important for the State to formally recognise those who do become involved and contribute to communities, and society as a whole, by making an exceptional contribution as active citizens. While a number of schemes exist to recognise outstanding achievements in different walks of life, Ireland is one of the few countries without a formal State awards system. Such a system could build on the Young Citizens' Awards presented by the President during the European Year of Citizenship through Education in 2005. The Taskforce recommends:

that National Presidential Citizen Awards should be introduced to recognise outstanding contributions to civic and community life. These would be awarded to a limited number of people selected by an independent process based on nominations by members of the public. Presentation of the Awards could act as a focal point for the Active Citizenship Week

The Fianna Fáil–Green Party government's programme after the 2007 election endorsed this recommendation. Bertie Ahern clarified that these awards were "entirely different from the State awards system" he envisaged. He said the government was negotiating the details of the scheme with the President's office. In April 2009, it was reported that the Active Citizenship Office planned to have the system in place within three years. In July 2009, the McCarthy Report, on government cuts in response to the post-2008 economic downturn, recommended closing the Active Citizenship Office, and this was done from the next tax year.

==== Distinguished Service Award for the Irish Abroad ====
On Saint Patrick's Day 2012, Eamon Gilmore, the then Minister for Foreign Affairs and Trade, announced that the Fine Gael–Labour government had decided to create a "Presidential Distinguished Service Award for the Irish Abroad". The President confers the award annually, to a maximum of ten "people living abroad who have given sustained and distinguished service to Ireland". According to the original press release at least one person is to "be chosen from the following sectors: Irish community support; the arts, culture and sport; charitable works; business and education; peace, reconciliation and development work". Awards are conferred annually in a process administered by the Department of Foreign Affairs.

== Other medals ==
=== Defence Forces ===
The Irish Defence Forces issue a range of decorations for gallantry, distinguished service, operational deployments, and long service. Among the most notable of these is the Military Medal for Gallantry and Distinguished Service Medal.

=== Garda Síochána ===
The Garda Síochána, the national police service of Ireland, issues medals for UN peacekeeping service, long service, and some commemorative events.

- Garda Medal for UN Service – Awarded to Garda members who complete overseas UN missions.
- Garda Long Service Medal – Presented after 22 years of service with an unblemished record.
- Garda Jubilee / 50th Anniversary Medal (1972) – Issued to all members serving at the force's 50th anniversary.
- Garda Pilgrimage Medal (Rome 1982) – Awarded to members who participated in the official pilgrimage to Rome.
- Garda Millennium Medal (2000) – Commemorating the year 2000.
- Garda 1916 Commemorative Medal – Recognises the participation of members in 1916 Rising commemorations.
- Garda Centenary Medal (2022) – Awarded to all serving members to mark 100 years of the force.

=== Civil Defence ===
Civil Defence Ireland recognises service and commitment through its medal programme.

- Civil Defence Long Service Medals – Awarded in 10, 20, 30, 40, and 50-year grades.
- Civil Defence Special Olympics Medal – For members who supported the Special Olympics World Summer Games.
- Civil Defence Lourdes Medal – For members who participate in at least three Lourdes pilgrimages.
- Civil Defence COVID-19 Pandemic Medal – Recognises service during the COVID-19 Pandemic national response.

=== Irish Prison Service ===
The Irish Prison Service recognises distinguished service, long service, and commemorative participation.

- Prison Service Distinguished Service Medal – Awarded for exceptional dedication or bravery in the prison service.
- Prison Service Long Service Medal – Awarded at 21 years.
- Irish Prison Service 2016 Commemorative Medal – Issued for the centenary of the Easter Rising.

=== Irish Coast Guard / Maritime ===
The Irish Coast Guard and Department of Transport recognise gallantry at sea, meritorious service, and long service.

- Michael Heffernan Medal for Marine Gallantry – Awarded in Gold, Silver, and Bronze classes for acts of bravery in saving life at sea.
- Marine Meritorious Service Medal – Awarded in Gold, Silver, and Bronze for exceptional non-gallantry contributions to maritime safety.
- Medal for Gallantry for Saving Life at Sea (1925) – Predecessor to the Michael Heffernan Medal. Awarded only once to Skipper Alfred Britton.
- Irish Coast Guard 2016 Centenary Medal – Awarded to mark 100 years since the 1916 Rising.
- Irish Coast Guard Marine Long Service Medals – Awarded at 10, 20, and 30 years.

=== Local Authority Fire Services ===
Local authority fire brigades issue national commemorative medals for firefighters.

- Irish Fire Service 1916 Commemorative Medal (2018) – Marking the Rising’s centenary, issued to serving firefighters in 2016.
- Long Service Medal – Issued to serving firefighters on the completion of 20 years of service.

=== Civilian bravery ===
Civilian gallantry awards are administered by Comhairle na Míre Gaile (the Deeds of Bravery Council).

- Gold Medal for Deeds of Bravery – Highest civilian award for life-saving acts of heroism.
- Silver Medal for Deeds of Bravery – For significant bravery, slightly below Gold standard.
- Bronze Medal for Deeds of Bravery – For meritorious acts of civilian bravery.
