= Leslie de Barra =

Irish nationalist and republican

- Born: Leslie Price; 9 January 1893; Dublin, Ireland
- Died: 9 April 1984 (aged 91); Cork, Ireland
- Other names: Leslie Barry, Mrs Tom Barry

Leslie Mary de Barra (née Price; 9 January 1893 – 9 April 1984) was an Irish nationalist and republican active during the Easter Rising of 1916, the War of Independence and the Civil War, becoming Director of Cumann na mBan. She went on to be chairman and President of the Irish Red Cross.

== Early life ==
Born Leslie Mary Price in Dublin in 1893 to Michael and Mary Price. Her father was a blacksmith and she was one of six children. She wanted to be a teacher and by 1911 had become a Monitress, a common way for girls to get into the teaching profession. Two of her brothers were involved in the Irish Volunteers and she was a member of Cumann na mBan. In advance of the Rising, with the confusion over orders and lack of information, she stated that she "did not question anything" as, with all that was happening, there were often odd events in her house. But they were all waiting for the mobilisation orders for the Easter Rising.

== Easter Rising ==
De Barra's role during the republican rebellion in Ireland, Easter 1916, was to act as a courier carrying messages and ammunition between the main headquarters in the General Post Office and other posts. She did her role well during the Rising and gained the respect of many Irish Republicans. On the orders of one of the principal leaders of the rising - Seán Mac Diarmada, de Barra (Price) and fellow Cumann na mBan member Bríd Dixon were promoted in the field and treated as Officers. de Barra later admitted that the job was stressful. She was stationed both in the GPO and in the Hibernian Bank. It was while she was in the bank that she came closest to death, standing beside Captain Thomas Weafer while he was shot. Another soldier who went to his aid was also shot. De Barra barely had time to grab Capt. Weafer before he died. She was the person sent to fetch a priest for the dying and wounded soldiers on the Thursday. By the Friday evening de Barra was in the GPO and was with the group evacuated with Louise Gavan Duffy. Once they reached the hospital on Jervis Street she parted company from Duffy and headed to Jacob's factory to see how the rebels were getting on there. She was also arrested and held in Broadstone Station but quickly released.

== After the Rising ==
By 1918 de Barra represented West Cork in the Cumann na mBan convention and became a member of the executive committee. She left her teaching career to focus fully on the organisation required by the republican movement in 1918. She travelled the country by train and by bicycle to get women to join the local branches of the Cumann and take part in the activities needed by the movement. She was tasked by the IRA's GHQ to set up specific lines of communication between Dublin and the Provincial commands. Within the year the organisation had grown from 17 to over 600 branches. She was Director of the organisation during the period up to the end of the war.

De Barra married Tom Barry on 22 August 1921, in Cork during the Truce period in the lead up to the Anglo-Irish Treaty. At the wedding were men who later ended up on opposite sides. Both Éamon de Valera and Michael Collins were guests. Her husband was staunchly Anti-Treaty even though he had been friends with Collins. Although her husband was a staunch republican and a major figure in the Irish War of Independence and the Irish Civil War, while she was serving in the GPO in Dublin during the rising he was in Mesopotamia serving the British Army in the First World War.

== Humanitarian work ==
In later years de Barra was central to the Irish Red Cross. Initially she got involved by organising the care of children orphaned by the Second World War. She represented the Irish Red Cross at conferences in Toronto, Oslo, Monaco, New Delhi, Geneva, Vienna, The Hague, Athens, Istanbul, Prague. She and her husband handled refugees from Czechoslovakia and Poland. Through the Red Cross she was able to ascertain the status of Irish held by the Spanish during the Spanish Civil War, officially Ireland was remaining neutral and could not get involved. de Barra was Chairman of the Irish Red Cross from 1950 to 1973.

De Barra was instrumental in the setting up of the Voluntary Health Insurance organisation in the late 1950s. In 1962, with the Red Cross de Barra launched the "Freedom from hunger" campaign in Ireland which later became the organisation Gorta. De Barra was chairman of Gorta also.

In 1956 a memorial to 1916 was unveiled in Limerick. It had been designed by Albert Power and the commemoration of the Rising was held in May 1956 and the monument unveiled by de Barra.

In 1963 de Barra was awarded an honorary degree from University College Dublin along with Éamon de Valera and others.

In 1971 she was part of a series to look back on the events leading to Irish Independence and her story was broadcast by Raidió Teilifís Éireann

In 1979 she won the Henry Dunant Medal which is the highest award of the Red Cross Movement.

De Barra and her husband lived in Cork, on St Patrick's street from the 1940s until his death in 1980. She died on 9 April 1984 in Cork and is buried with her husband in St Finbarr's. She is remembered today in the Leslie Bean de Barra Trophy awarded for the Cork Area Carer of the Year.
