= Sinn Féin Printing & Publishing Company =

Former Irish publishing company

- Company type: Limited Liability
- Industry: Printing; Publishing
- Founded: 1906
- Headquarters: Dublin, Ireland
- Key people: Arthur Griffith, Chairman & Editor; Seán T. O'Kelly, Secretary; Henry Dixon, Board; Thomas Kelly, Board; Seumas McManus, Board; Walter L. Cole, Board; Denis Devereux, Technician
- Products: Sinn Féin & Sinn Féin Daily newspapers
- Revenue: £6328 (1911–12)

The Sinn Féin Printing & Publishing Company, Ltd. (1906–1914) was a Dublin-based enterprise founded by Arthur Griffith, chief propagandist of the nationalist Sinn Féin movement. It published, and for several years also printed, the influential weekly newspaper Sinn Féin. It also very briefly printed and published a daily paper. The company was close to bankruptcy in 1914 when it was closed down for sedition by the British authorities under the provisions of the Defence of the Realm Act.

== Genesis of the Sinn Féin Printing & Publishing Company ==
The history of the Sinn Féin Printing & Publishing Company (SFPP) begins in March 1906 when Arthur Griffith, editor of the nationalist propaganda newspaper the United Irishman, was sued for libel by a Limerick parish priest, Father Donor. The offending passage was the following:

The Rev. Mr. Leslie, of Castlebellingham, who threatened the Gaelic league with his wrath for daring to hold a Feis on Sunday, has, we regret to say, found an imitator in a Catholic clergyman at the other side of Ireland – the Rev. Father Donor, of Shanagolden. This gentleman acted similarly towards the Gaelic League of Foynes, which proposed to hold its Feis on a Sunday, and to appease him the Feis was held on a week day, with the result that numbers of people were deprived from attending it. Although the Sunday fixture was abandoned to please him, neither Father Donor nor any of his curates attended the Feis.

The case against Griffith was weak but the judge found him far "too saucy in his attitude" and ordered him to pay £50 in damages to the priest and £253 3s. 9d. for court costs. At this stage the company was already in financial straits and the board of directors did not have the necessary £300. Griffith and the Board had, however, anticipated such an outcome and when the court-appointed bailiffs called on the Fownes Street office of the United Irishman Ltd. to collect the money, they discovered that the company had just gone into liquidation and seized the only assets they could find: a table, a few chairs and some manuscripts. Griffith took advantage of the court case to make a new start with what he hoped would be a more financially viable company, less dependent on funds from the Irish Republican Brotherhood (IRB) in the British Isles and Clan na Gael in the United States, both of which had been behind the setting up of the United Irishman in 1899.

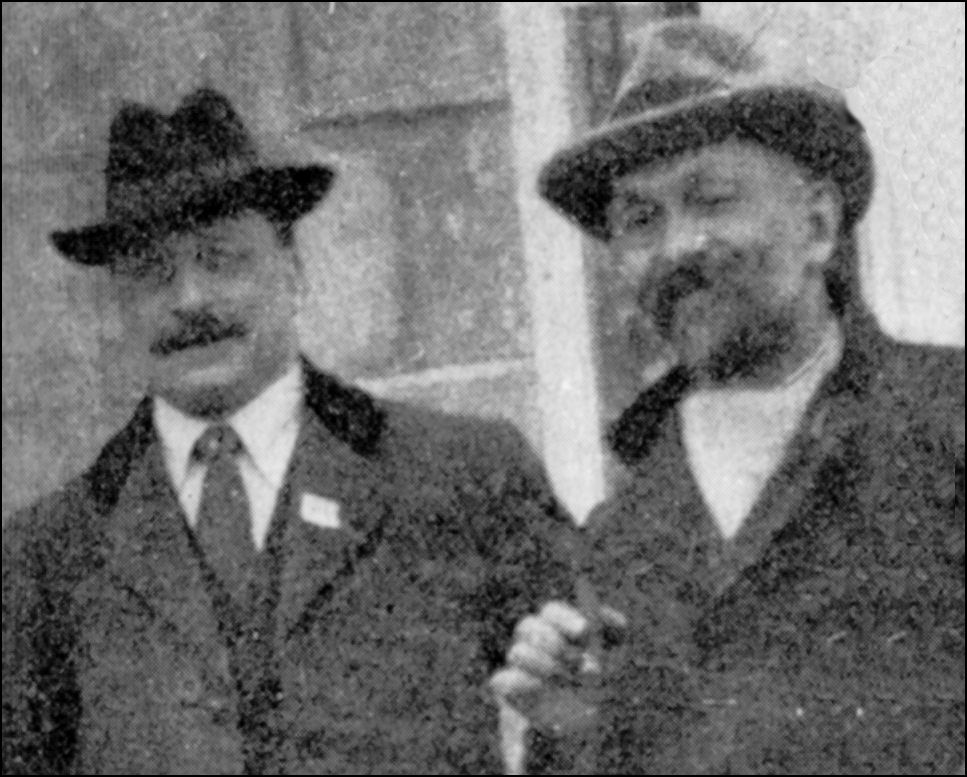
Arthur Griffith & Walter Cole (right)

After the closure of the United Irishman Ltd., the directors did not waste any time and a draft prospectus appealing for investors was ready for inspection on 11 April 1906, the day the SFPP was set up. This document announced the sale of 1,000 ordinary shares priced at £1 each and 2,000 debentures priced at £5 each for the purpose of financing a new weekly newspaper:

A meeting held today to form company. Present Messrs. Arthur Griffith, Thomas Kelly, John O'Mahony, Joseph Hallinan and Henry Dixon. It was decided to form a company to be called the Sinn Féin Printing and Publishing Company Limited. Mr. P. Lavelle solicitor was instructed to make all arrangements for the registration of the company. A draft prospectus submitted was approved of. Mr. D. MacCarthy was appointed secretary. The following were appointed directors with powers to them to co-opt two others whenever they thought it advisable. Messrs W. L. Cole, Alderman Thomas Kelly, Henry Dixon and Arthur Griffith. The capital of the company to consist of £1000 in 1000 ordinary shares of £1 each. It was also arranged to raise money by debentures. Tenders were received from P. C. D. Warren Kilmainham and Messrs Fowler Crow St. for the printing etc. of Sinn Féin. It was decided to accept the tender of Messrs. Fowler. Mr. Lavelle solicitor was instructed to prepare debentures

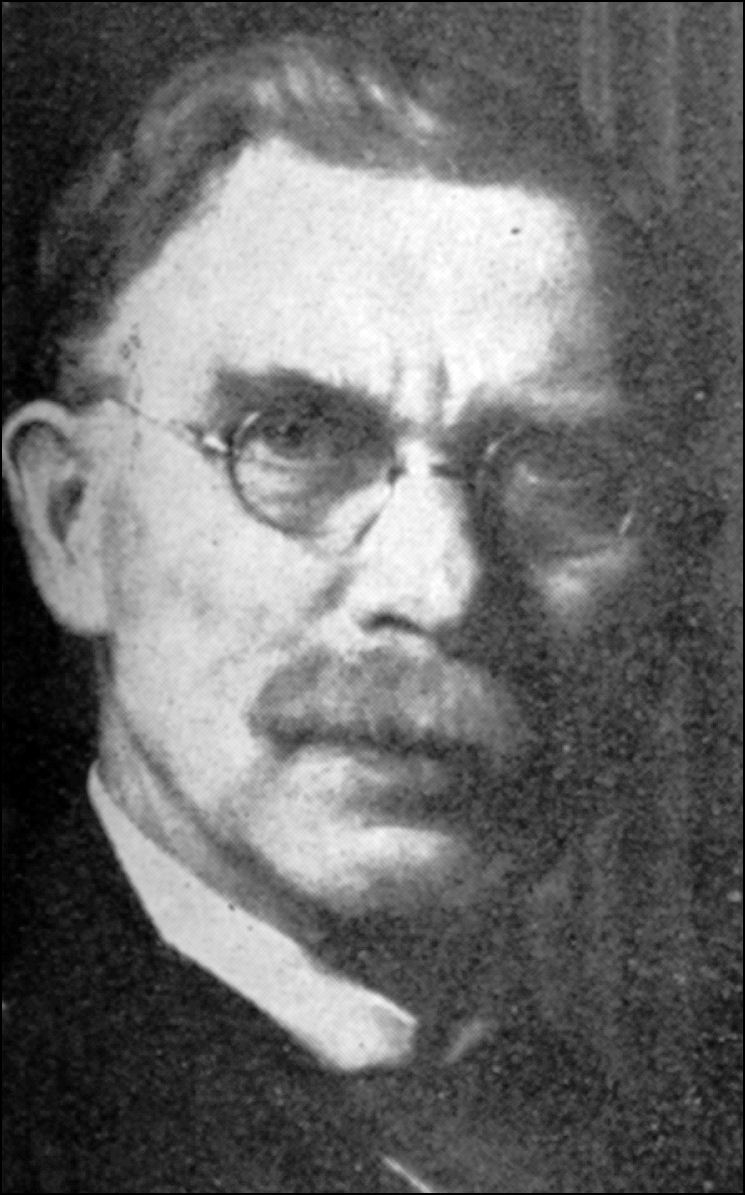
Alderman Thomas Kelly, board member

At a second meeting on 23 April it was reported that applications for 55 shares had already been received. Arthur Griffith was appointed managing director and Editor of Sinn Féin at a salary of £200 per year. Seumas McManus was also co-opted onto the board. After many years of involvement in literary, cultural and political clubs, Griffith and the other board members were all well known in Dublin's nationalist circles. They were also influential personalities in their own right in their respective social and professional fields. Griffith was not only a pillar of the Irish-Ireland movement but also, thanks, to his father's leadership role in the printing trade and his own very substantial experience in the newspaper industry, a respected figure in Dublin's printing and typographical community. Both Thomas Kelly and the fruit trader Walter Cole were popular Dublin Corporation aldermen; John O'Mahony was a hotel proprietor; Henry Dixon was a lawyer and influential IRB veteran; and Seumas McManus, the nationalist novelist, already had a flourishing reputation on both sides of the Atlantic. From April 1906 onwards, this group actively sought a return on this social investment from their friends, family, neighbours, colleagues, and former classmates.

== Financing the New Company ==
Clearly not convinced of the viability of the venture, the public were not enthusiastic about investing in the new company and the response to the share offer was poor: in 2 years only 167 of the 1,000 shares were purchased.

Thanks to a handful of wealthy sympathisers, the sale of debentures was more successful but the identity of some of the debenture holders suggests that many of these were donations rather than true investments. The first 20 debentures were bought by Edward Martyn, president of Sinn Féin from 1905 to 1908 and patron of many of Griffith's enterprises. John Sweetman, second president of Sinn Féin bought debentures 21 to 70, and the third most important investor, holder of 50 debentures, was Roger Casement, also a patron of many nationalist organisations until his execution in the aftermath of the 1916 Rising.

In spite of this generosity, the ambition of the board to make the SFPP, as its name indicates, a printing company as well as a newspaper publishing company, could not yet be satisfied. The cost of fitting out a printshop was too high and therefore, after a call for tenders, the printing of Sinn Féin was subcontracted to Fowler & Co., a neighbour of the SFPP, which handled the printing of the newspaper until May 1908. From then until the autumn of 1910, the contract was given to An Cló Chumann, a Dublin company specialised in Irish language printing which Seumas McManus had helped to set up several years previously.

== The Sinn Féin Daily ==
The first step towards the internalisation of the printing of the newspaper was taken on 5 October 1908, approximately two years after the setting up of the company, when the board launched a subscription for a daily edition of Sinn Féin. In spite of the reluctance of his friends to take such a financial risk, the astute Griffith was aware of a shift in Irish reading habits and was convinced that there was a market for a new daily newspaper. At the same time, the weekly Sinn Féin was finding it difficult to defend itself against attacks from its daily competitors.

Front Page of Sinn Féin with cartoon

During the campaign for the North Leitrim by-election where Charles J. Dolan ran for the Sinn Féin party, this was perceived as a serious handicap. Griffith decided to seize the moment. On 24 September 1908, 8,000 debentures at £1 each were put on sale. The reduced price was intended to allow as many supporters as possible to take part in the creation of the new newspaper. The promotional material accompanying the debenture application form explained why this was so important:

No National newspaper exists in the daily Press of Ireland, and Irish affairs are therefore treated by the existing Press from the standpoints of rival English parties. A result of this denationalising attitude is political chaos and economic impoverishment. The directors are convinced that the time is ripe for the foundation of a daily organ in the Press of Ireland which, being free from the influence of any English party, will deal with the affairs of Ireland from the Irish standpoint, and whilst asserting the National distinctiveness and independence of Ireland will promote combination and agreement amongst all political sections in Ireland on the questions of Language, Land, Taxation, Industries, Transit, Poor Law.

Victory Press of Type used by SFPP

Supporters with limited budgets were allowed to pay in four instalments, but when a reader of the weekly newspaper, writing in the name of low-paid workers with large families, suggested the creation of savings clubs, Griffith encouraged the idea enthusiastically. The public response was more enthusiastic this time and by 7 May 1909, the Board had already received 3,386 applications. Ó Ceallaigh's minutes for this period reflect an atmosphere of general optimism: the SFPP was in contact with several suppliers of printing equipment, was recruiting personnel, and was actively looking for a new publishing office and a location for its printshop. Griffith was a prudent businessman, however, and the SFPP negotiated simultaneously with the Linotype Machine Co. for the purchase of a Cox Duplex printing press, and the manager of the Ireland's Own Publishing Co., Mr. Walsh, for the printing of the newspaper. If the printshop failed once again to materialise, the SFPP would still have the option of subcontracting to Walsh. This time, Griffith's gamble paid off and he succeeded in establishing his printing works in Middle Abbey Street, across the street from the Freeman's Journal and the newspaper wholesalers Eason & Son. The financial health of the SFPP remained, however, extremely fragile as payments for debentures trickled in over a six-year period. These sums came in handy for petty cash and to pay small bills but could not be used for any long-term investment. Griffith was therefore forced to make the daily newspaper as attractive as possible for the greatest number of readers, what might be called "tabloidisation" today. In contrast with the austerity of Griffith's previous publications, the Sinn Féin Daily was abundantly illustrated with cartoons, photographs and maps. We find large tables of national statistics, articles on industry or the language movement, and extracts from the Resurrection of Hungary side by side with descriptions of the latest Paris fashions, serialised novels and sensational news gleaned from the international press. It is a measure of Griffith's understanding of the market and his skill as an editor that the circulation of the two newspapers reached 64,515 during the month which followed the launch of the daily.

== Readership ==
Conventionally, the SFPP is considered a failure. Virginia Glandon, one of the historians who have most researched the company describes the falling circulation of Sinn Féin in the following way:

Sinn Féin’s circulation grew, then dropped steadily during the years 1909 through 1911. The number of copies distributed during the week of 3 September 1909 totalled 64,515; with 25,515 copies going to various agents throughout Ireland, 32,482 to Eason’s, a major Dublin outlet, 5,472 to cash sales, and 1,044 to subscribers. During the week of 16 January 1910, the daily circulated 29, 961 copies and the weekly only 3,463. In financial difficulty from the outset, the daily collapsed during that same month, but with its failure, the weekly raised its circulation to 6,307 during March of that year. […] As of 3 March 1911, Sinn Féin circulated only 4,452 copies a week.

This approach (also adopted by Michael Laffan and Kevin Rafter) does not take readership into account. Mathew Staunton has argued that the core business of the SFPP was propaganda and that in spite of falling sales and financial difficulties Griffith and his colleagues were very successful in achieving their aims:

A conservative estimate would put readership at five or six times the number of newspapers sold, somewhere between 300,000 and 400,000 and, if we consider these impressive figures, it is clear that in terms of propaganda the operation was a success

Unfortunately for the SFPP, this success did not translate into a large sum of money and would not have generated more than £100, which represents only half of what was necessary to run the newspaper. On top of that, unlike Eason & Son who paid their bills promptly every month, the smaller agents who were dotted all over the country seem to have been far less diligent and it was sometimes necessary to send a representative of the SFPP to collect overdue payments in person.

== Financial problems ==
As a result, the board did everything in its power to reduce general costs and maximise revenues. Representatives were sent to the United States to collect funds, and readers were encouraged to continue buying debentures and pay what was due on those they had already applied for. At the same time it refused to pay certain invoices and entered into litigation with many of its suppliers to delay as many payments as possible. It was the performance of the advertising department, however, that most concerned the board during the difficult period which followed the launching of the daily newspaper.

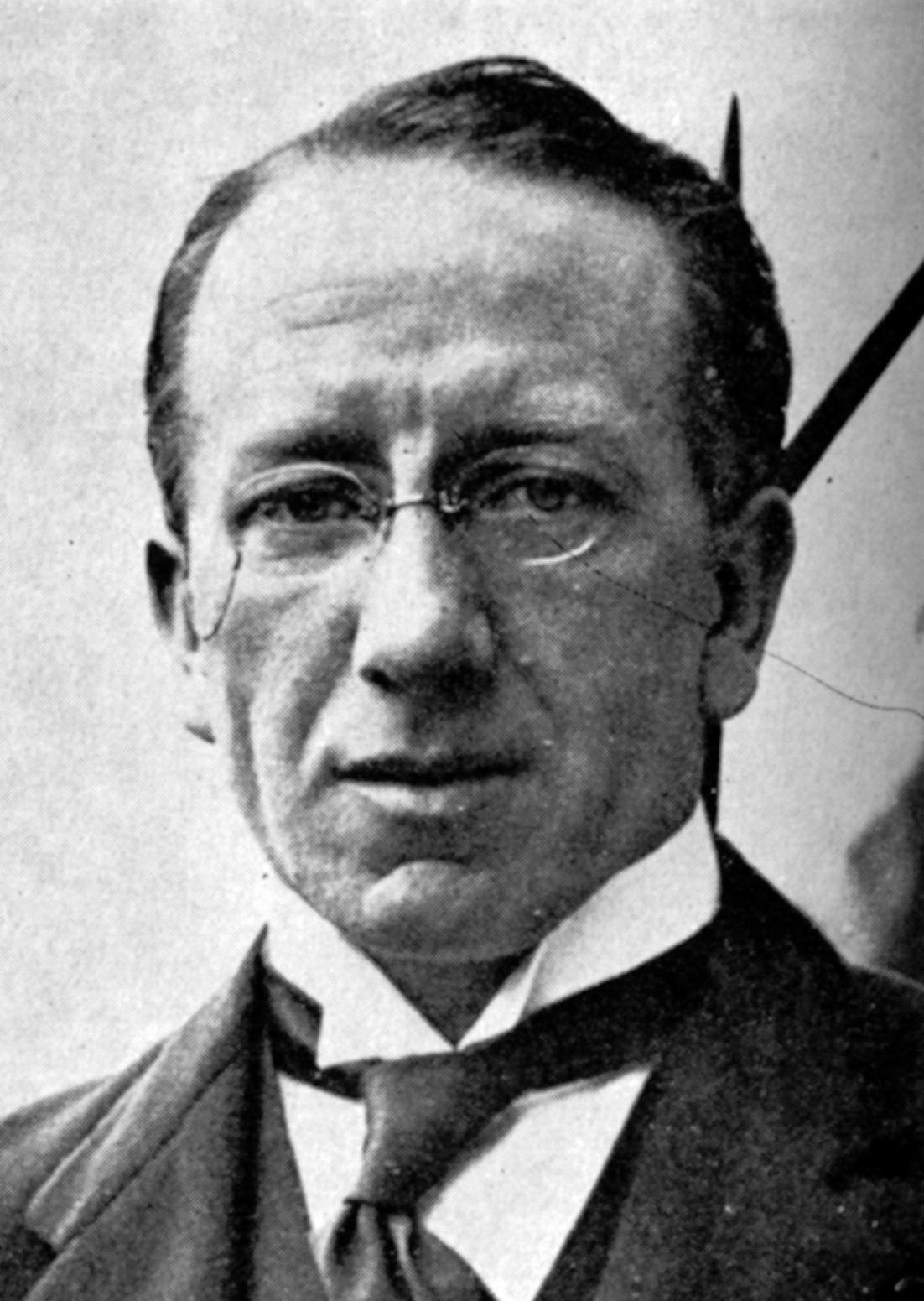
Seán T. Ó Ceallaigh, Secretary & Manager

When sales of the newspaper reached 60,000 and advertising sales amounted to more than £80, the SFPP could just about subsist. Unfortunately, after the sales record of the first weeks of the daily, probably due to the curiosity of the public, the figures dropped steadily and by Christmas had decreased by half. The Board eventually resorted to lending itself money via the Sinn Féin People's Bank and canvassing for emergency funds from wealthy Dublin businessmen sympathetic to the cause. Although the loans were recorded in all transparency, it is impossible to estimate how much money was received from friends. In his autobiography, Ó Ceallaigh names some of the anonymous benefactors he visited during this difficult period. The most important and most generous of them were the city councillor Pat Corrigan, the jeweller Myles Hopkins, and the furniture manufacturer Mac Uí Dheá. According to Ó Ceallaigh, they each gave him hundreds of pounds on a regular basis and more than once saved the SFPP from closing down.

== Republican challenge ==
Such was the volume and impact of Griffith's propaganda that hardcore republicans were reluctant to leave him a clear field to spread his unorthodox message. From the outset they challenged the SFPP for the spokesmanship of the Sinn Féin movement and on 13 December 1906, only seven months after the first publication of Sinn Féin, Bulmer Hobson launched his own weekly propaganda newspaper called The Republic. This was a small operation run by a group of volunteers but it nevertheless had a disproportionate influence that could not be ignored. As its name suggests, its raison d'être was to promote republicanism within Sinn Féin:

[The Republic] has been started to gather together all that is best and greatest, most progressive and far-seeing in Ireland round the Republican banner and to build up, not a Republican party, but an independent Irish Republic.

Criticising the objective of double monarchy fixed by Griffith, The Republic also questioned Sinn Féinism as defined in the pages of his newspaper. As a result of his tireless efforts to republicanise Sinn Féin, it was Hobson rather than Griffith who was chosen by Clan na Gael in 1907 to tour the United States and explain the movement to the Irish-American community. So successful was he in this that when he returned to Ireland he was considered by many Americans the leader of Sinn Féin. He also became the Irish correspondent for John Devoy's influential newspaper, the Gaelic American, and took full advantage of this position to further undermine Griffith's authority in Ireland. Griffith, however, had an ace up his sleeve that the republican faction never succeeded in neutralising: the SFPP was a limited liability company. This prevented any infiltration by the IRB and guaranteed the absolute independence of the board of directors. With both the name of the company and of its publications registered with the Customs House in Dublin, Griffith and his colleagues effectively owned the name “Sinn Féin” and their newspaper would be perceived as the official organ of the movement no matter how much the republican faction might protest. In 1910, P. S. O'Hegarty and some of his London republican allies attempted to dissociate the newspaper from the party. Although he praised the Sinn Féin Daily, and even called it the "best daily newspaper in Ireland", he was disappointed by what he perceived as the bowdlerisation of the Sinn Féin message. Both O'Hegarty and Hobson attacked him in the Irish Nation and Peasant which had replaced The Republic. With the aim of preventing any such incidents in the future, O' Hegarty proposed the following resolution at the annual Sinn Féin convention of 1910:

That this convention wishes to dissociate the Sinn Féin organisation from the general policy of the Sinn Féin paper in its recent developments, and that, in view of the fact that the organisation has no control whatever over the paper which bears its name, the Editor be requested to cease advertising the newspaper as the official organ of the movement.

Protected as he was by the law, Griffith resisted this manoeuvre without any great difficulty and the group which gravitated around Hobson and O'Hegarty withdrew in disgust from the movement. This was not, however, the last time that O'Hegarty and Hobson would challenge Griffith. In November 1910, they launched Irish Freedom, another republican newspaper financed by the IRB. According to Hobson,

Irish Freedom represented the militant left wing of the Irish national movement, and advocated the independence of Ireland by every practicable means, including the use of physical force.

This was one competitor too many for the SFPP, which was already heavily in debt and had been forced to shut down the Sinn Féin Daily in January. The defection of hardline republican Sinn Féiners to Irish Freedom and the growing success of the Irish Parliamentary Party was having an increasingly negative impact on readership figures. A dramatic fall in advertising sales led to the dismissal of the majority of the personnel, and the SFPP was forced once again to subcontract the printing of the newspaper. Gradually, what had been "the best newspaper in Ireland" became little more than a pamphlet, stripped of its illustrations and typographical flourishes. By the time the newspaper was banned by Dublin Castle in 1914, it had dwindled to four narrow pages containing a single block of text written exclusively by Griffith. With debts of almost £5,000, the shutting down of the newspaper allowed the board to escape their creditors in a relatively honourable fashion. Ó Ceallaigh who was the only person present when the Dublin Castle official came to announce the end described this moment in his autobiography:

We didn’t have a penny when we needed it most. We were heavily in debt. We couldn’t pay the printers. The proscription of the newspaper by the Castle came just in time. The military tyrants did us a real favour – they took our newspaper but they left us with our honour.

Because of the increasingly seditious content of Sinn Féin (Griffith attacked the British war effort in every issue) it was inevitable that it would be banned. This may have been a deliberate strategy on his part to separate himself of the debt-ridden SFPP, blame the British authorities and get a new publishing project off the ground. The fact that Griffith had already started editing a new newspaper, Éire-Ireland, for the IRB before Sinn Féin was banned would support this to a certain extent. At the very least, it suggests that Griffith expected to be banned and was not prepared to tone down his language.

== Bibliography ==
- Davis, Richard: Arthur Griffith and Non-Violent Sinn Féin, (Tralee: Anvil Books, 1974).
- Glandon, Virginia: Arthur Griffith and the Advanced Nationalist Press, (New York: Peter Lang, 1985).
- Hobson, Bulmer: Ireland Yesterday and Tomorrow, (Tralee: Anvil Books, 1968).
- Maye, Brian: Arthur Griffith, (Dublin: Griffith College Publications, 1997).
- McGee, Owen : The IRB, The Irish Republican Brotherhood from the Land League to Sinn Féin, (Dublin: Four Courts Press, 2005).
- Ó Ceallaigh, Seán T.: Seán T, (Baile Átha Cliath: FNT, 1963).
- Ó Duibhir, Ciarán: Sinn Féin: The First Election 1908, (Manorhamilton: Drumlin Publications, 1993).
- Ó Lúing, Seán: Art Ó Gríofa, (Baile Átha Cliath: Sáirséal agus Dill, 1953).
- Staunton, Mathew: 'The Nation Speaking to Itself: A History of the Sinn Féin Printing & Publish Co. Ltd. 1906–1914' in The Book in Ireland, J. Genet, S. Mikowski, F. Garcier [eds.], (Newcastle: Cambridge Scholars Press, 2006).
