= Bríd Dixon =

Irish nationalist

Bríd Dixon Fee
- Born: Bridget Angela Dixon; 13 February 1893; Phibsborough, Ireland
- Died: Dublin, Ireland
- Other names: Bridget, Brigid

Bríd Dixon (born 13 February 1893) was an Irish nationalist and republican who was one of the women in the GPO during the Easter Rising of 1916.

== Early life ==
Bríd Dixon was born Bridget Angela Dixon to Henry Dixon and Mary Gillis of Phibsborough, Dublin. Dixon was educated in Irish at the instruction of her father, a nationalist and a solicitors clerk. She attended Muckross Park Dominican Convent in Donnybrook, and she alongside her sisters attended Irish College in Ballingeary on several occasions. Dixon was a member of the Keating Branch of the Gaelic League. As with many others Dixon then joined the Cumann na mBan's Central branch. She learnt first aid and marched at major events like the O'Donovan Rossa funeral. Dixon was a founder member of Na bAisteoiri - a Dramatic Society for the production of plays in the Irish Language. It later became the Comhar Dramuiochta.

== Revolution ==
The weekend before the Easter Rising, Dixon's father sent her out of the city. Her brother cycled out to her to let her know where she was to report on the Monday. Dixon assisted Brigid Foley in delivering money in safety, but with the confusion during the week, for the first few days Dixon and those with her were not used much. By midweek they had made it into town and during the fighting made their way into the General Post Office (GPO). Dixon was with Leslie Price, and they were given separate jobs once they arrived.

On arriving, Dixon worked for Louise Gavan Duffy in the kitchen upstairs. On Wednesday she was sent out as a messenger with ammunition for Father Mathew Hall in Church Street, alongside Price, as the two were often sent with dispatches together. Eventually with the main group of women in the GPO they were evacuated from the building, and only a small number of women remained with the men. Although questioned by the soldiers and unable to go home until the hostilities were completely over, Dixon was not arrested or imprisoned.

Dixon later married Bernard E. Fee, an engineering draughtsman, on 12 August 1931.
