= Walter L. Cole =

Irish politician (1866–1943)

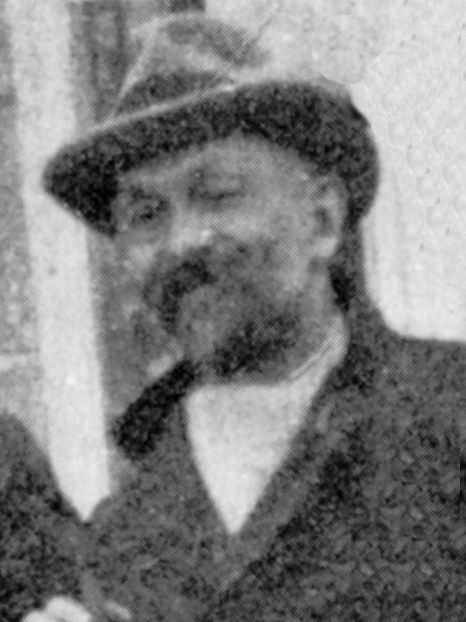
- Cole, c.1910

Teachta Dála
- In office June 1922 – August 1923
- Constituency: Cavan

Personal details
- Born: 15 May 1866 Liverpool, England
- Died: 26 April 1943 (aged 76) Dublin, Ireland
- Party: Sinn Féin (Pro-Treaty); Cumann na nGaedheal
- Spouses: Anna Harrison (1894–1921); Mary Redden (1928–1943)
- Children: 5
- Education: University of London

Walter Leonard Cole (15 May 1866 – 26 April 1943) was an Irish merchant and politician in the early twentieth century. Prior to the foundation of the Irish Free State, he was an alderman for a period. An active republican, he was a founding director of the Sinn Féin Printing & Publishing Company. He also led the Sinn Féin grouping in Dublin Corporation in the early 1900s.

== Personal life ==
Cole was born in Liverpool on 15 May 1866 to an Irish father, George Cole, a railway accountant, and an English mother, Arabella Hughes. He was educated at the St Francis Xavier's College, Liverpool and the University of London. He married Anna Harrison in 1894, who had been born in the USA. The couple moved to Dublin and had three sons. Harrison died in 1921, and Cole married Mary Redden in 1928, with whom he had two daughters.

== Politics ==
As a well-off supporter of the underground Irish republican movement in the early twentieth century, his house on Mountjoy Square seems to have been a regular meeting place for senior figures within that movement. The notes of Seamus Reader, an Irish Volunteer from Glasgow, record a meeting on 2 January 1916 at Cole's house:

Shortly after 5pm on the 2nd, January 1916, I went to Cole's house, Mountjoy Square, Dublin, where, while waiting in the kitchen for tea, I jotted my coded notes for my report to Scotland. I then went to the room where I met Tom Clarke, Sean McDermott, J Connolly, P Pearse and McDonagh.

All of whom were signatories to the Proclamation of the Irish Republic and all of whom were executed the following May, as leaders of the Easter Rising.

Cole is also documented as having hosted provisional Dáil meetings at his home, the assembly having been driven underground in September 1919. He was arrested by the military at his home at No. 3 Mountjoy Square in 1920.

Cole supported the Anglo-Irish Treaty and was elected to the 3rd Dáil as a pro-Treaty Sinn Féin TD for Cavan constituency at the 1922 general election. He was elected alongside party colleagues Seán Milroy and Arthur Griffith. Cole was defeated at the 1923 general election when standing as a Cumann na nGaedheal candidate.

Cole unsuccessfully contested the 1925 Seanad election. He was later a commissioner for Mountjoy Square.

Dáil	Election	Deputy (Party)	Deputy (Party)	Deputy (Party)	Deputy (Party)
2nd	1921	Arthur Griffith (SF)	Paul Galligan (SF)	Seán Milroy (SF)	3 seats 1921–1923
3rd	1922	Arthur Griffith (PT-SF)	Walter L. Cole (PT-SF)	Seán Milroy (PT-SF)	3 seats 1921–1923
4th	1923	Patrick Smith (Rep)	John James Cole (Ind.)	Seán Milroy (CnaG)	Patrick Baxter (FP)
4th	1925 by-election	Patrick Smith (Rep)	John James Cole (Ind.)	John Joe O'Reilly (CnaG)	Patrick Baxter (FP)
5th	1927 (Jun)	Patrick Smith (FF)	John O'Hanlon (Ind.)	John Joe O'Reilly (CnaG)	Patrick Baxter (FP)
6th	1927 (Sep)	Patrick Smith (FF)	John O'Hanlon (Ind.)	John Joe O'Reilly (CnaG)	John James Cole (Ind.)
7th	1932	Patrick Smith (FF)	John O'Hanlon (Ind.)	John Joe O'Reilly (CnaG)	Michael Sheridan (FF)
8th	1933	Patrick Smith (FF)	Patrick McGovern (NCP)	John Joe O'Reilly (CnaG)	Michael Sheridan (FF)
9th	1937	Patrick Smith (FF)	Patrick McGovern (FG)	John James Cole (Ind.)	Michael Sheridan (FF)
10th	1938	Patrick Smith (FF)	Patrick McGovern (FG)	John James Cole (Ind.)	Michael Sheridan (FF)
11th	1943	Patrick Smith (FF)	Patrick O'Reilly (CnaT)	John James Cole (Ind.)	Michael Sheridan (FF)
12th	1944	Patrick Smith (FF)	Patrick O'Reilly (CnaT)	Tom O'Reilly (Ind.)	Michael Sheridan (FF)
13th	1948	Patrick Smith (FF)	John Tully (CnaP)	Patrick O'Reilly (Ind.)	Michael Sheridan (FF)
14th	1951	Patrick Smith (FF)	John Tully (CnaP)	Patrick O'Reilly (FG)	Michael Sheridan (FF)
15th	1954	Patrick Smith (FF)	John Tully (CnaP)	Patrick O'Reilly (FG)	Michael Sheridan (FF)
16th	1957	Patrick Smith (FF)	John Tully (CnaP)	Patrick O'Reilly (FG)	Michael Sheridan (FF)
17th	1961	Patrick Smith (FF)	Séamus Dolan (FF)	Patrick O'Reilly (FG)	3 seats 1961–1977
18th	1965	Patrick Smith (FF)	John Tully (CnaP)	Tom Fitzpatrick (FG)	3 seats 1961–1977
19th	1969	Patrick Smith (FF)	Patrick O'Reilly (FG)	Tom Fitzpatrick (FG)	3 seats 1961–1977
20th	1973	Patrick Smith (FF)	John Wilson (FF)	Tom Fitzpatrick (FG)	3 seats 1961–1977
21st	1977	Constituency abolished. See Cavan–Monaghan			
