= Operation Shamrock =

Plan to bring non-Jewish German children to Ireland after World War II

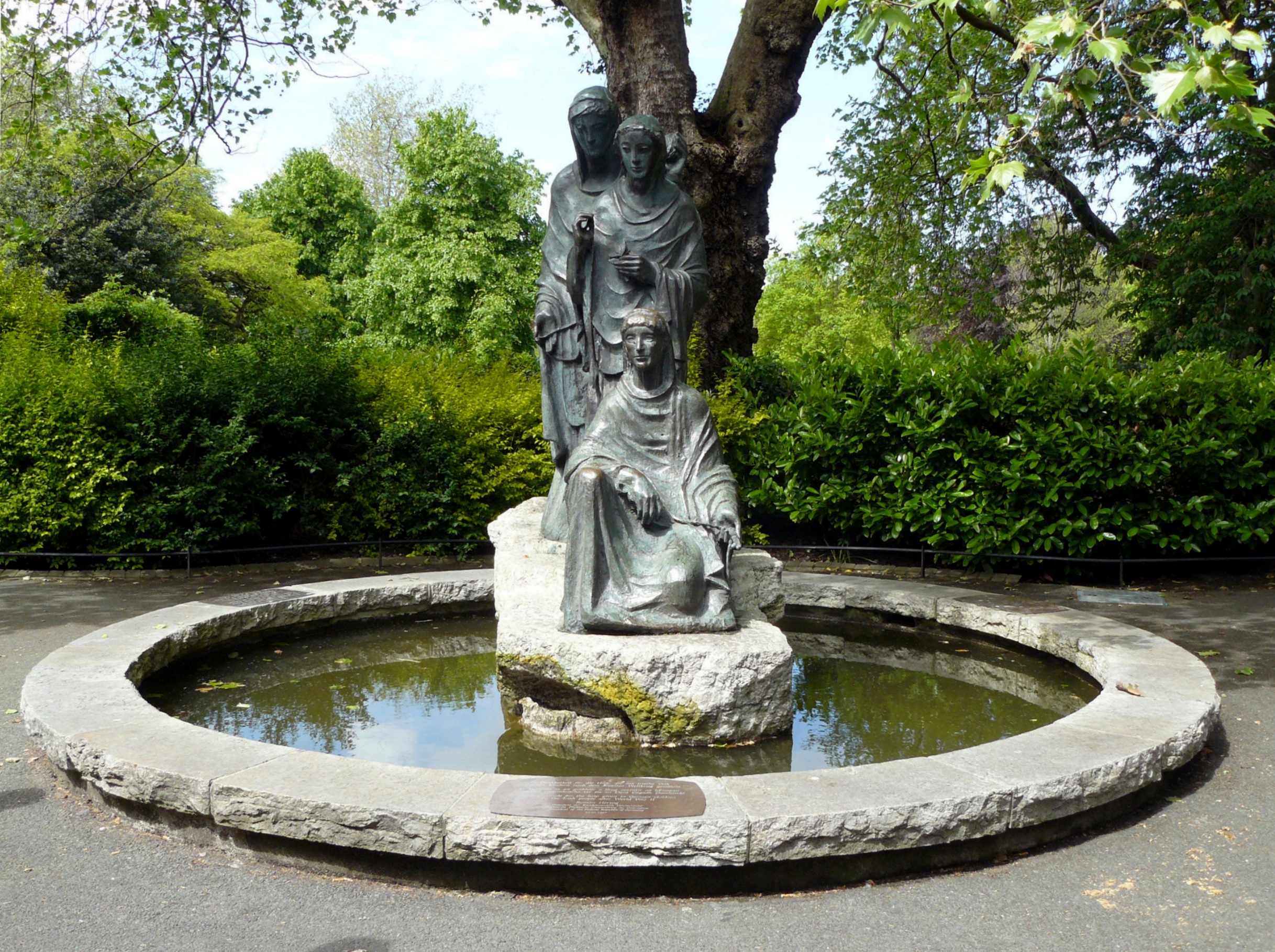
The Three Fates fountain in St Stephens Green, donated by the West German government in thanks for Operation Shamrock.

Operation Shamrock was a scheme bringing refugee children from mainland Europe to Ireland in the aftermath of the Second World War. It was organised by the Irish Red Cross, and involved about 500 children, mostly from Germany, who stayed for three years before returning home.

== Save the German Children Society ==
The Save the German Children Society (SGCS) was founded on 16 October 1945 at a meeting in Shelbourne Hall, Dublin, to find foster homes for German children in Ireland. A number of pro axis activists in Ireland joined together, along with some well-meaning people, to set up the society. Many of its leading members were longstanding Pro-Axis supporters like Maurice O’Connor, Dr. Liam Gogan, P.S. O’Sullivan and Sean O’Bradaigh. People were aware of the Nazi influence within the group with Irish Times columnist Vincent Brittain describing it as ‘merely a thinly veiled excuse for the dissemination of Fascist propaganda’. The president was Kathleen Farrell (née Murphy), a paediatrician at whose house Charlie Kerins had been arrested in 1944. Dan Breen was treasurer. A Garda Special Branch attendee reported some speakers favoured assisting Germany from anti-British sentiment. Hermann Görtz, a convicted German spy, became secretary of the SGCS on his release from prison. The SGCS proposed to house Catholic and Protestant children with families of the same denomination, and not to take Jewish children, who it feared would not integrate. Kathleen Lynn became vice president of SGCS in 1948 but was dissatisfied with its preference for Catholic children. Sidney Czira and Eamon Kelly were also members.

The SGCS secured hundreds of volunteer families, 90% Catholic. It had contact with religious charities in the British Zone and approached the Irish government about transporting children from there via Great Britain. The centenary of the Great Irish Famine was a motivator for the Fianna Fáil government to assist Europe in general in the post-war hardship, but it agreed with the British government that the SGCS was an unsuitable organisation and refused to permit immigration under its auspices. The SGCS applied to the Allied Control Council and the United Nations Relief and Rehabilitation Administration but was advised to use the Irish Red Cross to arrange for migration.

== Red Cross ==
The Irish Red Cross had by 14 February 1946 received 100 French children as refugees, and government efforts were ongoing to secure Polish refugee children.

In Spring 1946, the British authorities agreed to allow children to leave Germany. The Irish government agreed to host some for three years, after which they would be sent back to relatives in Germany. German Catholic charity Caritas had by May selected 100 children aged between 5 and 14, predominantly from the Ruhr area of North Rhine Westphalia. They were put in the care of the Irish Red Cross. The first 88 children arrived in Dún Laoghaire on 27 July 1946. The initial reception centre was St. Kevin's Hostel at Glencree, County Wicklow, a former reformatory school owned by the Minister for Supplies. There Daughters of Charity of Saint Vincent de Paul nuns provided treatment for transmissible diseases and malnutrition. The Red Cross then liaised with the SGCS to place the children in the homes found by the SGCS. Some children were removed from abusive homes, while most adapted quickly, learning English and sometimes forgetting their German.

Between 1 January 1946 and 25 June 1947, 1000 aliens were registered under the Aliens Act 1935 as having immigrated to Ireland, of whom 462 were children; 421 of those were German, all but 18 of whom came via the Red Cross. Some were orphans but others had parents incapable of caring for them, for reasons such as internment as POWs, homelessness, or illness. In 1949, when the time came to return to Germany, many children did not wish to do so. Where host and German families were both willing, the SGCS applied to the government to allow the children to stay in Ireland. Against the wishes of the Red Cross, about fifty did so.

== Aftermath ==
Irish assistance to Germany reinforced in Britain the perception, fostered by wartime neutrality, that Ireland was pro-Nazi. Conversely, West Germany in the 1950s had gratitude for Ireland's postwar relief aid, and ties grew between the countries. In January 1956 a memorial fountain sculpted by Joseph Wackerle and commissioned by the German Gratitude Fund was unveiled in St Stephen's Green, Dublin, by the West German ambassador.

In 1961, the German war cemetery was opened near St Kevin's Hostel, Glencree, for graves of German aviators killed in Ireland during the war. In 1974, the hostel became the Glencree Centre for Peace and Reconciliation, which played a role in the Northern Ireland peace process in the 1990s.

German-language courses provided for refugees in Dublin led to the foundation of St Kilian's German School.

In March 1997, a reunion of over 300 foster-children and families was held at the German embassy in Dublin, attended by Presidents Mary Robinson of Ireland and Roman Herzog of Germany.

As part of The Gathering Ireland 2013, 21 refugee children from Germany, France and Austria returned to Glencree.
