= Joseph Wackerle =

German sculptor

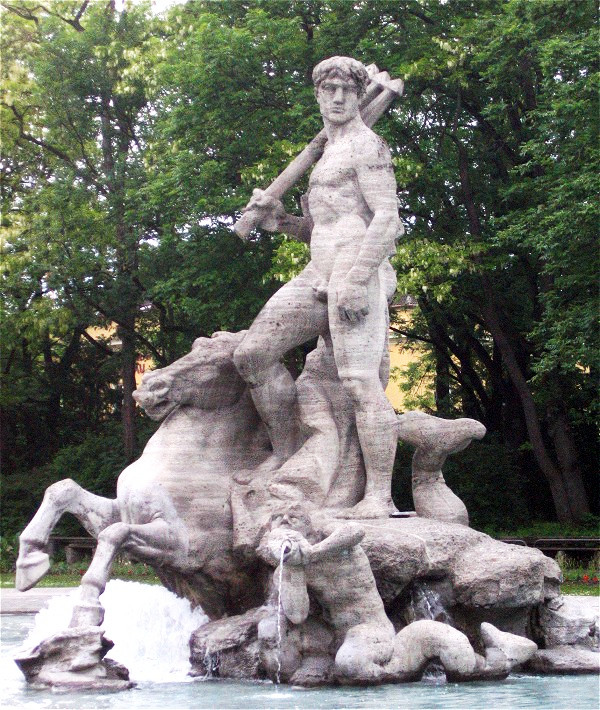
Neptune Fountain in the Alter Botanischer Garten in Munich

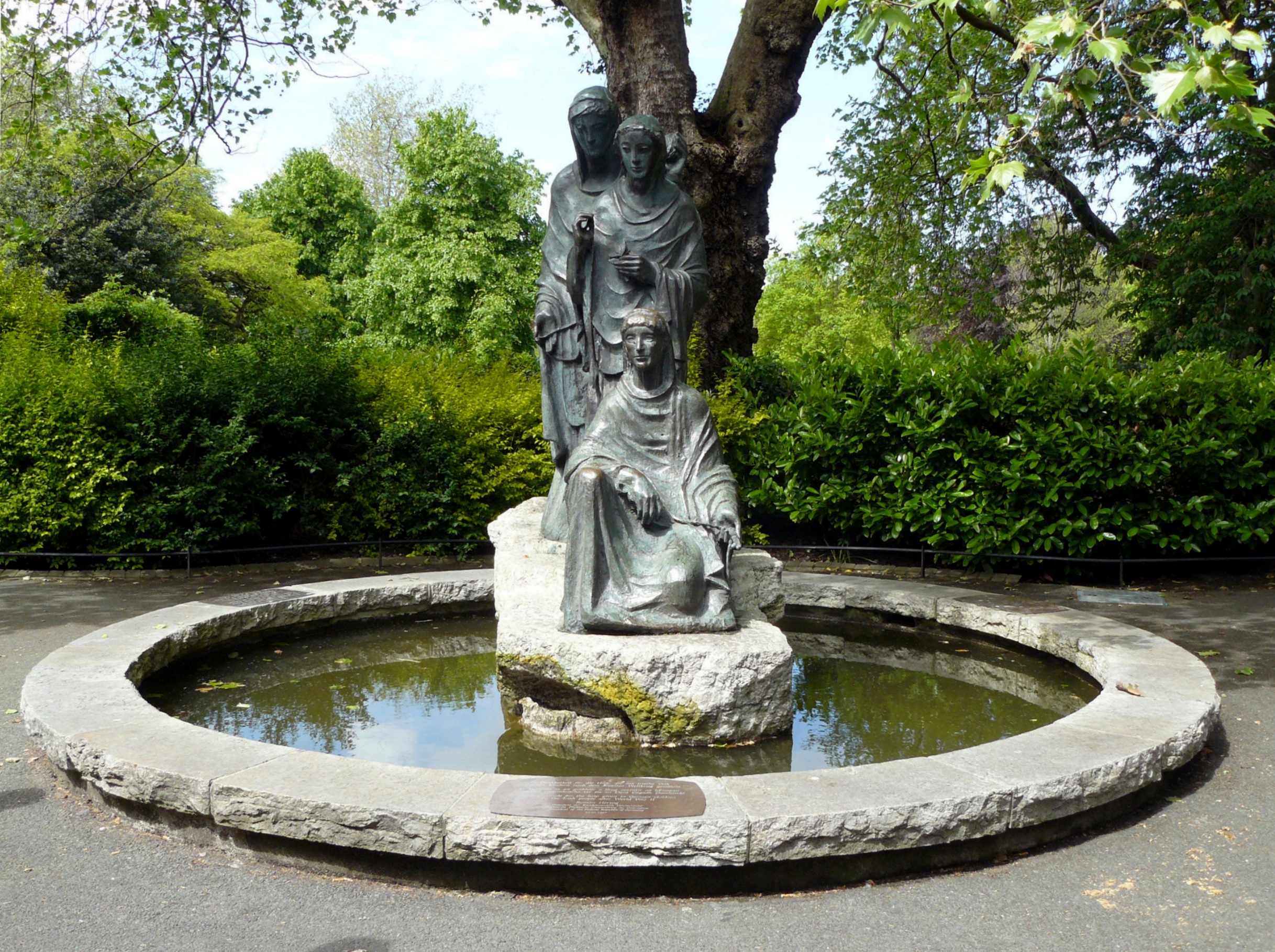
The Three Fates in St Stephen's Green, Dublin, donated by the German government in thanks for Operation Shamrock.

Joseph Wackerle (15 May 1880, Partenkirchen – 20 March 1959, Partenkirchen) was a German sculptor. His work was also part of the art competitions at the 1928 Summer Olympics and the 1932 Summer Olympics.

== Life ==
Wackerle's grandfather was a wood carver, and his father was a builder. He was educated at the School of Applied Arts and at the Academy of Fine Arts in Munich. At 26, he was appointed artistic director of the Nymphenburg Porcelain Manufactory in Munich. From 1913 to 1917 he worked as a teacher at the Museum of Decorative Art in Berlin. He became a lecturer at the Munich Academy, where he taught until 1950.

In 1937, Joseph Goebbels proposed Wackerle, who was the Reich Culture Senator, for the German National Prize for Art and Science. In 1940, on his 60th Birthday, Wackerle received the Goethe Medal for Art and Science after a recommendation from Adolf Hitler. He was highly rated as an artist by the Nazi rulers, and in August 1944 he was named by Adolf Hitler on the list of the most important German sculptors, which freed him from military duty.

After the end of World War II Wackerle continued his artistic career and was still highly regarded in the Munich area. In 1953, he was awarded the Visual Arts Promotion Prize by the city of Munich.

He died in 1959 and is buried in the cemetery of Partenkirchen.
