= Irish Red Cross Society =

Red Cross branch in Ireland

- Crois Dhearg na hÉireann
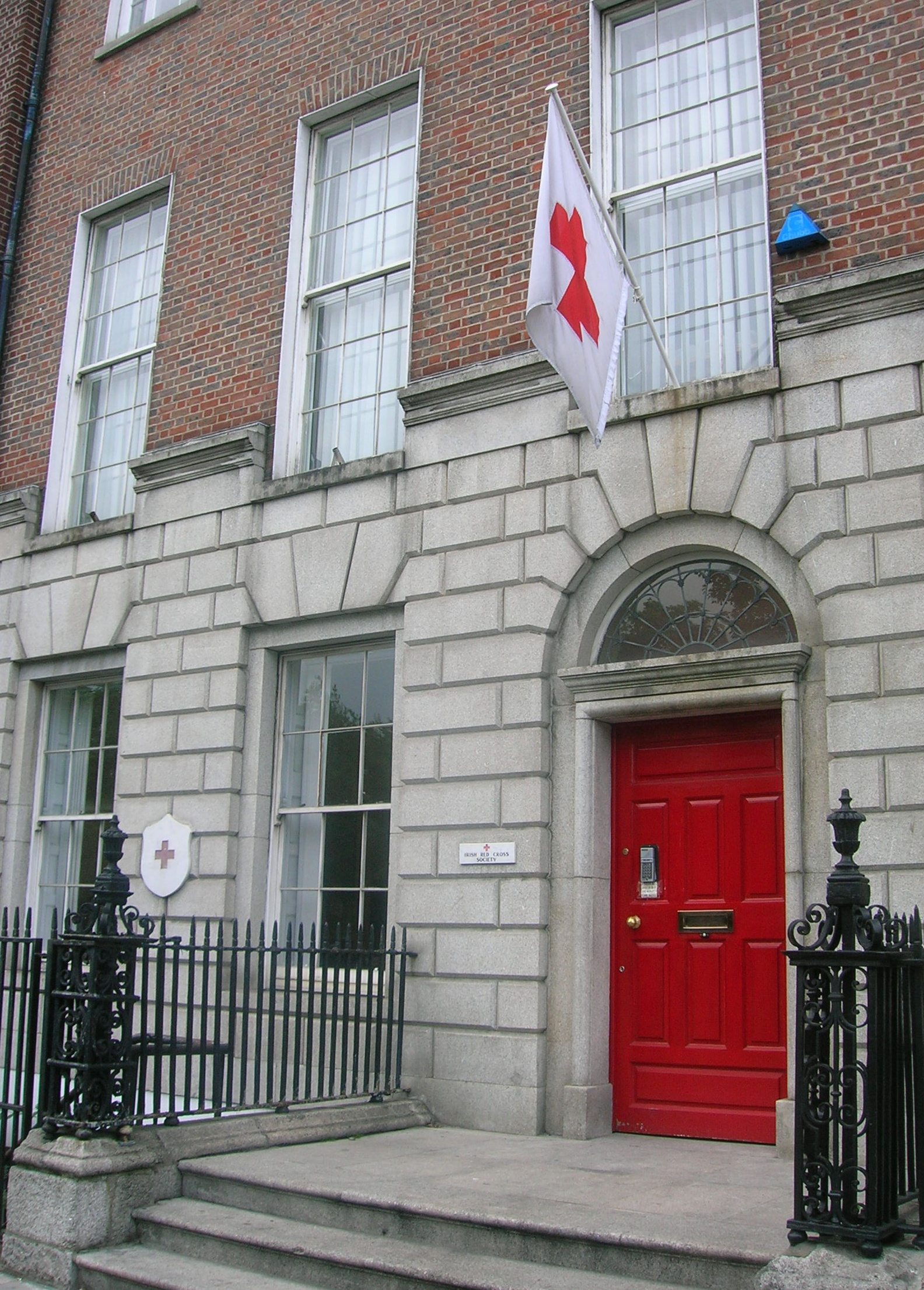
- Irish Red Cross head office, Merrion Square
- Formation: 6 July 1939; 87 years ago
- Registration no.: CHY3950
- Purpose: Red Cross Charter
- Headquarters: 16 Merrion Square North, Dublin 2 D02 XF85
- Location: Ireland
- President: President of Ireland (ex-officio)
- Chairperson: Pat Carey
- Secretary: Deirdre Garvey
- Board of directors: Olivia Mitchel- Vice-Chairperson, Brian Byrne- Treasurer, Ted Noonan- National Secretary, Cepta Dowling, Julie O'Brien, Martin Long, Donal Lawlor, Felix O'Regan, Cliona Lehane, Alexander Smyth, Will Meegan, Ann-Marie O'Sullivan
- Affiliations: International Federation of Red Cross and Red Crescent Societies
- Revenue: €17.641m (2025)
- Expenses: €21.796m (2025)
- Staff: 159 (2025)
- Volunteers: 3,400 (2025)
- Website: www.redcross.ie

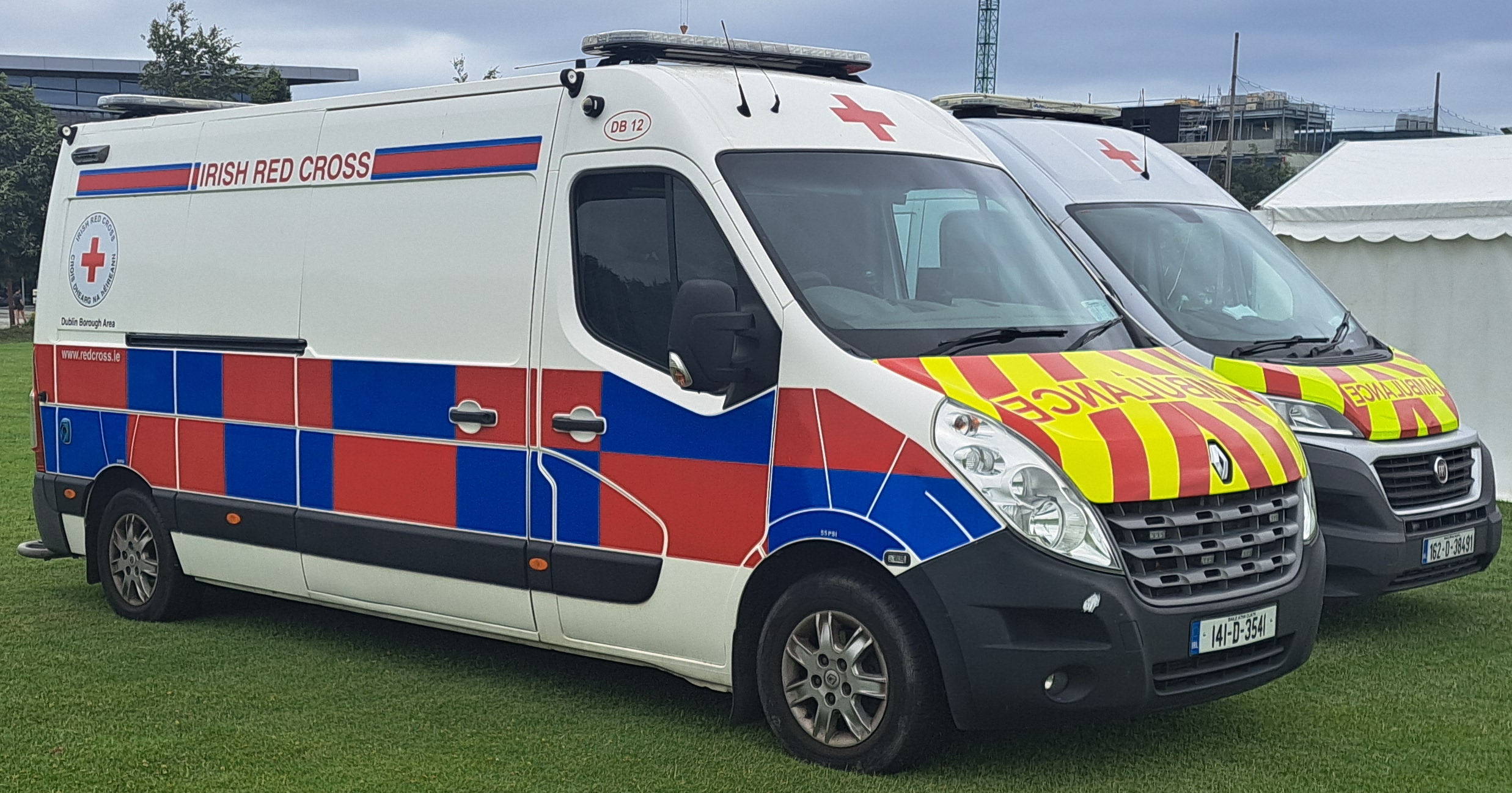
Red Cross ambulances at the 2025 World Medical Football Championships in UCD

The Irish Red Cross Society (IRCS; also Irish Red Cross or IRC; Irish: Crois Dhearg na hÉireann) is the National Red Cross Society for the Republic of Ireland. (Northern Ireland comes under the aegis of the British Red Cross.) The society was formally established on 6 July 1939 under the Red Cross Act 1938. It is affiliated to the International Federation of Red Cross and Red Crescent Societies. The society is organised on a voluntary basis. In Ireland, its activities include mountain rescue, first aid education of the public, the provision of first aid and ambulance services at public events, as well as other community services for older people, carers, migrants and prisoners. Outside Ireland, the society provides relief and humanitarian services in response to natural disasters and in regions of conflict.

== History ==
=== Precursors ===
The City of Dublin Branch of the British Red Cross Society was established in August 1914 on the outbreak of the First World War at a meeting convened by the Lady Aberdeen, wife of the Lord Lieutenant of Ireland, and presided over by the Lord Mayor of Dublin, Lorcan Sherlock. The interlinking of national military and Red Cross organisations complicated operation during the Irish revolutionary period. The republican women's organisation Cumann na mBan was modelled on the French Red Cross; in 1914 it tried to affiliate to the International Red Cross but was told to join to the British Red Cross. During the 1916 Rising, members of Cumann na mBan used red cross insignia; some were paramedics while others were military auxiliaries apparently unaware of the Red Cross' requirement for neutrality, whose activities were condemned by the British. The official [British] Red Cross also operated in the Rising, known as "VAD nurses" (Voluntary Aid Detachments) to distinguish them from the republicans. The Irish White Cross was established during the Irish War of Independence by the American Committee for Relief in Ireland. During the ensuing Irish Civil War the British Red Cross felt it was politically unwise to operate so the International Committee of the Red Cross (ICRC) intervened directly.

The Irish branch of the St. John Ambulance Association continued to operate after independence and T. F. O'Higgins suggested in the Dáil debate on the 1938 act that, already recognised under the Geneva Conventions, it might be recognised as the Irish affiliate of the ICRC. The Spanish Civil War (Non-Intervention) Act 1937, which prohibited Irish involvement in the Spanish Civil War, made an exception for units certified by the government as "Red Cross units" where "such unit is organised by or is working under the auspices of a society or organisation (whether established in Saorstát Eireann or in another country) having as its object or one of its objects the furnishing of volunteer aid to the sick and wounded of armies in time of war".

=== Legal establishment ===
In 1939 a ministerial order establishing the society was made under the 1938 act. Minor amendments of the 1939 order were made in subsequent decades.

The 1938 act's provision were based on the first three Geneva Conventions, and the act was amended in 1954 and 1998 to reflect the state's accession to the 1949 Fourth Geneva Convention and 1977 Protocol I and Protocol II additions.

=== Early decades ===
Between 1940 and 1945, ten sweepstake horseraces organised by the Irish Hospitals' Sweepstake raised £184,000 or 41% of the IRCS's total revenue in the period.

In the aftermath of the Second World War, the Irish Red Cross sent a team of 100 to staff a field hospital in Saint-Lô, France, including Samuel Beckett as an interpreter and storekeeper. He described his experiences in "The Capital of the Ruins".

Restrictions on the hire of Red Cross ambulances were introduced in 1955 and removed in 2006.

In the Arms Trial of 1970, it emerged that funds from an Irish Red Cross bank account had been channelled without the society's knowledge to the nascent Provisional IRA. The trial acquitted Charles Haughey, who testified that, when it became clear that the Irish Red Cross would not be permitted to operate in Northern Ireland, money was for relief of victims of sectarian violence was transferred instead to individuals, whose later actions were outside his control.

=== Post-1990 governance issues ===
From 1989 the government switched public grant-in-aid of the IRCS from the Department of Defence budget to the National Lottery.

In 1993, IRCS council member Jim Walsh was quoted in an article in The Irish Times criticising the society, despite having been directed not to give an interview. The executive council changed its rules to empower it to expel Walsh. After expensive litigation, in 1997 the Supreme Court ruled that the retrospective application of the new rule was ultra vires. In 1999 the 1938 order was amended to explicitly permit termination and refusal of membership, and to allow non-Irish nationals to be members.

There were personnel issues at the IRCS head office in 1998, when senior staff resigned, and in 1999, when staff protested at a dismissal and an "unprofessional atmosphere".

In 2003, the government gave €300,000 to the IRCS for disbursal to those affected by a landslide in Mayo.

In 2009, some financial irregularities were revealed anonymously on an anonymous blog by a whistleblower, Noel Wardick, who was head of the IRCS international department. Village magazine commented that a small number of long-serving volunteers on the executive committee governed the society, with the paid staff mere functionaries. The IRCS sought court orders to obtain Wardick's identity from UPC and Google, which were granted. Wardick was dismissed. Wardick had revealed that €162,000 collected locally for the 2004 Asian tsunami had remained unspent in a bank account years after the event. In 2010, an internal enquiry into Wardick's allegations found other such bank accounts, and proposals to overhaul the IRC's management were discussed in the Dáil on 15 December. Questions were answered by Tony Killeen, then the Minister of Defence. In 2011 a new Secretary General was appointed together with a new senior management team. After the 2010 report of the Comptroller and Auditor General (CAG) criticised the IRCS, the Oireachtas Public Accounts Committee heard from the CAG and the IRCS leadership and issued its own report.

In 2012 the 1938 order was substantially reformed. This included a reduction from one-third to one-tenth in the ratio of political appointees on the IRCS council, previously a source of criticism from the ICRC. The chairperson is also elected by the council, rather than nominated by the President on the advice of the Government.

Chairperson of the Irish Red Cross
Dates	Name
1939–1942	Charles J. Macauley
1942–1946	Conor Maguire
1946–1950	John Shanley
1950–1973	Leslie de Barra (née Price)
1973–≥1980	Joseph Adams
≤1981–≥1984	Carrie Acheson
1985–1989	P. D. [Patrick Diarmuid] Hogan
−1991	Derry O'Donovan
1991–1994	F. K. (Kevin) Murphy
1994–1997	Una McGurk
1997–2000	Richie Ryan
2000–2009	David Andrews
2010–2015	David J. O'Callaghan
2015–	Pat Carey

== Organisation ==
The President of Ireland has been President of the society since its foundation; ex officio under the Red Cross Act 1944, and before then by government order. The chairperson was until 2012 appointed by the President, and is ex-officio a member of Comhairle na Míre Gaile. The Secretary General is the senior permanent staff member.

The society has been supported by the Irish Department of Defence and it receives €739,000 grant aid p.a. from them. In addition to that, the Department of Defence gives €130,000 annually to the ICRC.

The first-aid services section of the society is organised into regions, areas, branches and units for command and administration purposes.

There are four regions in the country each with a Regional Director of Units who is responsible for co-ordination of the units in their region through their Area Directors of Units.

There are 28 areas in the Irish Red Cross (The Red Cross in Northern Ireland is part of the British Red Cross). Areas are normally divided up to match county borders i.e. the Clare Red Cross area has the same geographical bounders as county Clare itself. In this way the Red Cross differs from other organisations like Civil Defence Ireland, which is divided according to local council areas. The only exception to this being with Red Cross Areas in Dublin, they are aligned to local council areas due to the population of the city and outlying areas, this meaning there are four Red Cross Areas in Dublin.

Each area is commanded and administered by an "Area Director of Units" shortened normally to "ADU". This person is appointed for a three-year term by the Central Council. The Person however is a Volunteer and receives no payment for his/her work as are all person involved in the uniformed section, the person will normally have been a volunteer for a number of years and risen through the ranks. The ADU will normally appoint a deputy director of units (DADU) and a number of assistant area directors (AADU) to assist him. The DADU is second in command of the area and may take responsibility for a particular duty (e.g. Ambulance cover on public duties). The AADU's will normally have charge over a particular section within the area (e.g. cadet members) or a particular responsibility (e.g. equipment and training)

The ADU is assisted by the Area Committee, whose members are elected from the branch committees in the area each year at an A.G.M.

Each Area will have a number of branches in it, the number varying according to area. The branch is run by a committee of its own members, also elected at an A.G.M. each year.

Each Branch has a number of units in it the number again varying according to the branch. The unit is the main training group within that area, there may for example normally be only one unit in a village or group of village depending on population, whereas a city may have a number of units due to the population. The Unit is commanded and administered by the "Unit Officer" a person appointed by the ADU. The appointment last for one year but the person may be re-appointed continually. The Unit Officer is assisted by a "Sub-Unit Officer" and by "Assistant Unit Officers" also appointed by the ADU. The unit is where all members of the IRC would training and also where public first aid courses would be run from. Depending on the size of the Branch there may be different units for different age groups.

Persons may join the Irish Red Cross from 5 years of age, there is no maximum age. The Age profiles are broken as follows:

- "Teddybear" 5yrs-12yrs
- "Cadet" 12yrs-16yrs
- "Novice" 16yrs-18yrs
- "Senior" 18yrs+

Not all areas currently have units for the youngest age range as they are a new inclusion, in which very basic "first aid" is taught, things such as how to call an ambulance to putting on a plaster, progressing to higher levels as members grow older.

=== Ranks ===
The Ranks in the IRC are in descending order:

- National Director of Units (Three silver stars with red cross mounted in center, the lowest star surmounted with laurel leaves)
- Regional Director of Units (One silver star surmounted with laurel leaves and red cross mounted in center)
- Area Director of Units (Three silver stars, red crosses mounted in centres)
- Deputy Area Director of Units (Two silver stars, red crosses mounted in centres)
- Assistant Area Director of Units (One silver star, red cross mounted in center)
- Unit Officer (Two silver bars)
- Sub Unit Officer (Three silver chevrons)
- Assistant Unit Officer (Two silver chevrons)
- Unit Member (Navy epaulet bearing the Red Cross on a white background)
- Novice Member (16–18 years of age) (Sky blue epaulet with Red Cross on a white background)

All the Ranks (bar the novice member) are on navy epaulets, worn on the shoulders for the working uniform.

=== Activities ===
The Irish Red Cross has a fleet of both road and off-road ambulances in Ireland. It also has specialised Support vehicles, Command vehicles, mountain bikes, search dogs and a boat. The vehicles in the Area depending on locally need and decided upon by the ADU. These Fleets along with all IRC members provide a backup to the ambulance service in case of major emergency.

The IRC offers members of the public a number of courses. In particular Practical First Aid and First Aid Responder (formerly Occupational First Aid), as well as skin camouflage and hand care. The Irish Red Cross is a provider of First Aid Certification in Ireland. As a PHECC training institute it also offers the Cardiac First Response (C.F.R.) course.

If a person is a member of the Red Cross they can go on to Complete other courses such as:

- PHECC Cardiac First Responder Community (CFR-C)
- PHECC Cardiac First Responder Advanced (CFR-A)
- PHECC First Aid Responder (FAR)
- Intermediate First Aid
- Ambulance Procedures
- Emergency First Responder (E.F.R. PHECC course)
- Radio Operators Course
- Emergency Medical Technician (E.M.T. PHECC course)

However a member while encouraged to do some of these courses need not and can help the society by other means, such as fundraising activities, relief work or other areas.

The Irish Red Cross provides ambulance and medical cover at a large number of public events and functions the year round and across Ireland, including events such as concerts, motor sport events, equestrian events, rugby, soccer and GAA matches. While the events organizers are normally charged a fee, this money however does not go to the people on duty but rather to help fund the activities of the local branch.

The Irish Red Cross also provides relief services locally, nationally and internationally. Locally services range from "meals on wheels" to home visits and transport of the elderly, to nationally disaster relief such as in the wake of the flooding in Ireland in 2009. Internationally the IRC will collect donations for major relief works such as the 2010 Haiti earthquake, and will also send members abroad to assist with relief works.

==== Community Services ====
The Irish Red Cross provide a range of community services and activities. These include Therapeutic Hand Care Service, Skin camouflage service, Babysitting course, Helping You to Care Course, First Aid Training and an Entertainment Troupe Service.

- Therapeutic Hand Care Course: This service is provided to long-term patients in hospitals especially older patients with arthritis, joint pain and depression. Hand massage and manicures are offered by volunteers to prevent the joints from stiffening. The course is offered to both male and female patients.
- Skin Camouflage Service: This service offers specialised advice on using camouflage creams and powders to people with disfiguring skin conditions.
- Babysitting Course: This course is offered to people aged 14 years or older to teach them the best skills for babysitting. The comprehensive course defines the rights and responsibilities of a babysitter, child first aid and CPR, ways to prevent accidents, use of fire safety, child protection and child care skills.
- Helping You to Care Course: This course is for those who wish to care for others. Proper training is provided to them as they learn caring skills.
- First Aid Training: First Aid Training at the Red Cross includes variety of courses aimed to provide the basic life saving skills and stay calmwhen accidents happen. The courses include Occupational First Aid Training, Occupational First Aid Refresher Training, Basic First Aid Training, Basic Life Support Training and Public Access Defibrillation AED Training.
- Entertainment Troupe: This service is offered in children's hospitals where the entertainment troupe get involved in different fun activities such as painting, storytelling, clowns and balloon modelling. This service is meant to bring moments of happiness in the lives of the sick children being treated at the hospital.

== See also ==
- International Red Cross and Red Crescent Movement
- Order of Malta Ambulance Corps
- Operation Shamrock
