= Comhairle na Míre Gaile =

Comhairle na Míre Gaile (Council for the Recognition of Deeds of Bravery) is a council established by the Government of Ireland to recognise acts of bravery which attempt to save life. It has awarded medals and certificates, and may also award financial compensation with the consent of the Minister for Justice. The National Bravery Awards are presented annually at Farmleigh by the Ceann Comhairle, the chair of the council.

== Members ==
The council has listed seven members, of whom four constitute a quorum:

- the Ceann Comhairle of Dáil Éireann, the chair of the council
- the Cathaoirleach of Seanad Éireann
- the chairperson of the Central Council of the Irish Red Cross
- the Lord Mayor of Dublin
- the Lord Mayor of Cork
- the chairperson of the Association of County and City Councils (formerly called the General Council of County Councils)
- the commissioner of the Garda Síochána.

The secretary of the council is a civil servant in the Department of Justice.

== History ==
Comhairle na Míre Gaile was established by the Deeds of Bravery Act 1947. The concept was introduced on a non-statutory basis in June 1945, when a committee was formed with the same members who would later form Comhairle na Míre Gaile. A supplementary estimate of £250 was authorised for the Minister of Justice to fund the scheme's inaugural year, including the travel expenses of honorees to Áras an Uachtaráin to receive their awards from the President. James Dillon proposed that the Council of State should be the competent body rather than a new committee.

Originally the President was to present the highest award, the Gold Medal; other awards were presented by the local district court judge, or the mayor if the deed was in a city or borough. In recent years, all awards are presented in an annual ceremony by the Ceann Comhairle. The first Gold Medal was presented in 1956. Nine more were presented between 1992 and 2010.

== Awards ==
Acts of bravery are eligible for recognition if committed in Ireland or on an Irish-registered ship. Defence Forces personnel are not eligible for acts performed while on active service; however the Defence Forces have their own medals and awards, beginning with the medal issued to participants in the Easter Rising in 1941, on its 25th anniversary. Gardaí are eligible for Comhairle awards, although the Scott Medal is the Garda Síochána's own highest award for valour. The Royal National Lifeboat Institution (RNLI) reached an agreement with the state in 1948 whereby Comhairle na Míre Gaile would not make awards to RNLI personnel and the RNLI would not make awards to others for deeds which had already been recognised by Comhairle na Míre Gaile.

The medal may be awarded in gold, silver or bronze, with ribbons respectively coloured green, red, or blue, in each case with two white stripes. The medal was designed by Richard King after an open competition. From 1945 to September 2010, the council awarded 10 gold, 68 silver, and 261 bronze medals; 1,468 certificates; and nine letters of commendation.
