= Sinn Féin (newspaper) =

Former weekly Irish nationalist newspaper

Binding the Nation Together: Sinn Féin's View of its Role as Federator

Sinn Féin was a weekly Irish nationalist newspaper edited by the Dublin typesetter, journalist and political thinker Arthur Griffith. It was published by the Sinn Féin Printing & Publishing Company Ltd. (SFPP) between 1906 and 1914, and replaced an earlier newspaper called the United Irishman which was liquidated after a libel suit. The SFPP brought out the Sinn Féin Daily in 1909 but had to abandon it when it plunged the company into enormous debt. The Sinn Féin weekly and the SFPP both came to an end when they were suppressed by the British Government in 1914.

== Form ==
Front Page of Sinn Féin with cartoon

When the SFPP began to publish Sinn Féin in 1906 it was a large format (slightly larger than a modern broadsheet), 4-page newspaper with 7 columns per page.

== Graphic content ==
Trained as he was in the graphic side of newspaper production, Arthur Griffith had both a professional interest in and a profound understanding of visual culture. An anonymous article on advertising in Leabhar na hÉireann (The Irish Yearbook), probably written by Grifith himself, explains the benefits of American-style advertising techniques for promoting Irish-made products. The use of typography and images is particularly praised:

"The most useful and by far the most profitable method of attracting the attention is through the medium of an illustration. A good picture invariably captures the eye, and if it is of sufficient interest, may be relied upon to induce the reader to pursue the matter further."

He was also very much aware of how visual discourses could be used to defend the Irish nation against cultural Anglicisation. In his newspaper propaganda he continually promoted the use of such discourses to develop a strong brand awareness for the Irish nation.

=== Déanta i nÉirinn ===
The most important graphic element of the Sinn Féin newspaper was the Déanta i nÉirinn symbol. This distinctive logo was created by the Irish Industrial Development Association (IIDA). The text in Irish means "Made in Ireland". From the autumn of 1909, Griffith's newspapers displayed it proudly and very prominently on their front page between the words 'sinn' and 'féin' in the title-piece. It could also frequently be seen in advertisements and cartoons throughout. Both a trade description and a statement of Sinn Féin's industrial politics, this mark played a fundamental role in the newspaper propaganda published by the SFPP. Griffith felt it important to explain to his readers what the symbol meant in the context of Sinn Féinism and in relation to his newspaper:

"That is our registered Irish Trade Mark number. Sinn Féin is the only journal in Ireland entitled to use the Irish Trade Mark.The reason why is that Sinn Féin is the only daily journal in Ireland printed on Irish paper. Sinn Féin is printed with Irish ink. All the materials procurable in Ireland that go to make up a newspaper are used in Sinn Féin. All other daily journals in Ireland import their paper from England, America, France, or Holland. If they procured their paper and ink at home, at least £100,000 a year would be retained in this country and permanent employment provided for about 2,000 people. Sinn Féin is the only daily paper in Ireland that supports the paper-making and ink-making industries of the country. That is why Sinn Féin alone is entitled to bear the Irish Trade Mark. The Irish Trade Mark distinguishes what is Irish from what is spurious. We bear the Irish Trade Mark."

Déanta i nÉirinn (Made in Ireland) Symbol

Here Griffith blends Sinn Féin's industrial politics (buy Irish, provide employment, stop emigration) with a sales pitch for the new Sinn Féin Daily. While promoting his own newspaper at the expense of his competitors, Griffith highlights the existence of a native ink-making and paper-making industry. Other newspapers which purport to promote the national cause fall into the category of spurious. Their alleged nationalism is therefore extremely questionable.In his 1917 book Francis P. Jones, an American friend of Griffith's and historian of the early Sinn Féin movement explains the background to the creation of the trademark and the symbolism of its design. After outlining a major difficulty faced by Irish manufacturers, he describes the measures taken to protect them:

"Irish names were attached to goods that never saw Ireland until they were brought into the country ready for sale. The Sinn Feiners discovered the fraud, and countered by the establishment of the Irish trademark. A sign peculiar to Ireland was agreed upon, namely a scroll device representing the legendary Collar of Malachi, surrounded by the words, Deantha i nEirinn [sic.] (Made in Ireland). The use of this sign was permitted to manufacturers who could show that their goods were made in the country, and every infringement was prosecuted under the British Trades Mark Law, the Irish people being for once able to use British law to their own advantage."

=== Austin Molloy ===
For the first few years of its existence the circulation of Sinn Féin was limited. From January 1909 onwards, however, Griffith attempted to attract new readers by publishing a daily newspaper with sensational articles from overseas, a fashion column aimed at women readers, and a new graphic approach.

The Nation's Armour by Austin Molloy

Thanks to the purchase of two brand new Linotype machines, the newspaper became more attractive from a typographical point of view and easier to read. The addition of images gave Sinn Féin a far less austere look and at the same time significantly improved its commercial appeal, with sales reaching a peak of 64,000 in September 1909. Foremost among these images were the large political cartoons which regularly appeared on the front page. This user-friendly graphic discourse translated the National question into a series of emotionally charged life and death struggles set against familiar mythical and literary backdrops. At the same time, it illustrated Griffith's instructions to the individual Sinn Féiner, indicating the path to follow and the dangers to avoid.

The man responsible for these cartoons was the Dublin born designer, illustrator, and stained glass artisan Austin V. Molloy. At the age of twenty two Molloy was hired by the Sinn Féin Printing & Publishing Company to provide cartoons at a rate of 1 shilling and 6 pence per week. His work appeared in the newspaper between August 1909 and April 1911. As was the case for many of the contributors to Sinn Féin, Molloy used the Irish version of his name, Maolmhuidhe, to sign his contributions. It is only by consulting the minutes of meetings of the board of directors of the newspaper company that we can identify him as the Austin Molloy who trained at the Dublin Metropolitan School of Art between 1909 and 1916, at the same time as his more famous friend Harry Clarke. The art historian Theo Snoddy describes him as 'the main follower' of Clarke at the school but, although his illustrations from the 1920s onwards are unmistakably influenced by the work of his friend, his earlier work, which includes his cartoons for Sinn Féin, reveals his debt to the principal book illustrators at the turn of the century, chief among them being Jack B. Yeats. His cartoons provide us with a snapshot of the issues preoccupying Sinn Féin's propagandists between 1909 and 1911, namely the status of the Irish language, the development of Irish industry and the prevention of emigration. Although his training was only beginning, Molloy was already sensitive to the religious and folk themes he would illustrate in books and windows and the character he chose to represent the ideal citizen of an independent Ireland was inspired by the iconography of Saint Patrick, the Virgin Mary, and The Pilgrim's Progress, and reflects the explicitly religious language of the Sinn Féin propagandist Robert Lynd.

== Textual content ==
Through The United Irishman and Sinn Féin Griffith demonstrated the need to arrogate legislature from the hands of the British by transferring Irish Parliament back to Dublin. However, Irish Parliamentary parties quite clearly could not agree to Griffith's urgings, as such a move would undermine the foundation of their existence in Westminster. Sinn Féin thus served as conduit for Griffith's opposition to The Act of Union 1800.
