= United Irishman =

Irish nationalist newspaper 1899–1906

The United Irishman was an Irish nationalist newspaper co-founded by Arthur Griffith and William Rooney. It was first published on 4 March 1899 and ran from 1899 to 1906. Contributors included Oliver St. John Gogarty, Pádraig Pearse, Maud Gonne and Roger Casement. The writer James Joyce is quoted as saying that the United Irishman was "the only newspaper of pretensions in Ireland". In 1906 the United Irishman collapsed under a libel suit and was refounded as Sinn Féin, which ran until 1914 when it was suppressed by the British government.
