= History of the Gaelic Athletic Association =

The history of the Gaelic Athletic Association is much shorter than the history of Gaelic games themselves. Hurling and caid were recorded in early Irish history and they pre-date recorded history. The Gaelic Athletic Association itself was founded in 1884.

== Foundation and early history ==
The man credited with much of the original impetus for founding the GAA was Michael Cusack from County Clare, born in 1847. He was a teacher at Blackrock College in Dublin. In 1877, he set up his own cramming school, the Civil Service Academy, to prepare students for examinations for the British Civil Service. "Cusack's Academy", as it was known, and its pupils, did extremely well, resulting in soaring attendance. Pupils at the academy were encouraged to get involved in all forms of physical exercise. Cusack was troubled by falling standards in specifically Irish games.

To remedy this situation, to re-establish the ancient Tailteann Games as an athletics competition with a distinctive Irish flavour, and to re-establish hurling as the national pastime, Cusack met with several other enthusiasts on Saturday, 1 November 1884, in Hayes' Hotel, Thurles, County Tipperary.

Seven men are traditionally identified as the founder members: Cusack, Maurice Davin (who presided), John Wyse Power, John McKay, J. K. Bracken, Joseph O'Ryan and Thomas St. George McCarthy (a District Inspector of the Royal Irish Constabulary based at nearby Templemore). Accounts of attendance differ. A 2015 analysis by sports historian J. M. Tobin favoured a contemporary Tipperary Leader report listing thirteen attendees. In addition to the seven traditionally named, the report listed William Foley, E. Dwyer, Charles Culhane, William Delahunty, Michael Cantwell and John Butler.

The foundation day was chosen for its mythological significance: according to legend, Samhain (1 November) was the day when the Fianna's power died. Cusack meant this choice of day to symbolise the rebirth of the Irish heroes, and the Gaelic Athletic Association for the Cultivation and Preservation of National Pastimes was established, its name subsequently shortened to Gaelic Athletic Association.

Within a few weeks of the organisation's foundation, Thomas Croke, the Roman Catholic Archbishop of Cashel, gave it his approval and became its first patron. Its other patrons included both Michael Davitt and Charles Stewart Parnell. Cusack was a difficult man to get along with, but in the first few months of the organisation he proved to be an excellent organiser. He did not, however, continue to run the association for long after its foundation. Within eighteen months he was obliged to resign as a result of his failure to submit accounts for auditing.

Over the next few years the GAA evolved even more. In 1886, county committees were established. These became the units of representation for the new All-Ireland championship. Later, new rules for Gaelic football and hurling were drawn up by the Association and were published in the United Irishman newspaper. The year 1887 saw the first All-Ireland Championships being held in both codes of sport. 13 GAA counties out of the 32 counties of Ireland entered, although only five competed in hurling and eight in football.

== Twentieth-century history ==
From 1900 onwards a new type of person – those who were now being influenced by the Gaelic League (1893) – joined the movement. They tended to be clerks, school teachers or civil servants. In 1922 the association passed over the job of promoting athletics to the National Athletic and Cycling Association.

== Timeline of the GAA ==
- 1884: The Gaelic Athletic Association was founded on 1 November (Samhain: according to legend the day the Fianna fell from power) at Hayes' Hotel in Thurles, County Tipperary.
- 1886: Wexford County Board became the first GAA county organisation in the country.
- 1887: Tipperary and Limerick won the first All-Ireland Hurling and Football Finals respectively.
- 1892: The rules of hurling and football were altered: Goals were made equal to five points and teams were reduced from 21 to 17-a-side. Inter-county teams were introduced to the All-Ireland championships. Congress granted permission for the winning club to use players from other clubs in the county, thus the inter-county teams come into being.
- 1896: The value of a goal was further reduced from five points to three points.
- 1897: Rule 21 is introduced banning members of the police and British army from being members of the organisation.
- 1900: The provincial councils of Munster, Leinster, Connacht and Ulster were sanctioned.
- 1904: First official camogie matches.
- 1912: The Junior Championships were introduced at All-Ireland level.
- 1913: The Jones's Road Ground, Dublin, was purchased by the GAA and renamed Croke Memorial Park.
- 1920: Bloody Sunday: Twelve spectators and a player, Michael Hogan, were killed in Croke Park in a raid by Auxiliary Forces during the Irish War of Independence.
- 1923: Galway's hurlers won Connacht's first All-Ireland.
- 1924: The first revived Tailteann Games were opened in Croke Park.
- 1925: The declaration rule now meant that players could play for their county of birth, rather than their county of residence. Galway won Connacht's first All-Ireland Football title after a series of objections.
- 1926: The first radio broadcast of a GAA match took place when Galway play Kilkenny.
- 1927: The Railway Cup competitions were introduced.
- 1928: Kildare are the first county to win the Sam Maguire Cup.
- 1931: The name Cumann Lúthchleas Gael was adopted.
- 1933: Cavan's footballers won Ulster's first All-Ireland.
- 1932: The first All-Ireland Camogie Championship took place.
- 1935: The GAA entered its second half-century. A crowd of 50,000 attended the All-Ireland Finals.
- 1938: Micheál Ó Hehir commentated on his first GAA match.
- 1939: The Cork versus Kilkenny hurling match was remembered as the "thunder & lightning final" as the climax was played in a storm. On the same day the Second World War began.
- 1940: The penalty kick and penalty puck were introduced.
- 1947: The All-Ireland Senior Football Championship Final between Cavan and Kerry was played in the Polo Grounds, New York. Cavan emerge victorious.
- 1954: A hurling record 84,856 attended Croke Park when Cork played Wexford in the All-Ireland Senior Hurling Championship Final.
- 1959: The 75th anniversary of the GAA was commemorated with the opening of the first cantilevered New Hogan Stand at Croke Park.
- 1961: A record 90,556 attended the All-Ireland Senior Football Championship Final contested by Down and Offaly at Croke Park.
- 1961: The first Poc Fada tournament was held.
- 1962: The first GAA match was broadcast live on Telefís Éireann (now RTÉ).
- 1967: The first international rules football game was played against a side of Australian origin.
- 1971: The first All-Ireland Club Championships were played. Roscrea won the senior hurling competition and East Kerry won the senior football competition.
- 1974: The Ladies' Gaelic Football Association was founded in Thurles.
- 1976: Páirc Uí Chaoimh was opened in Cork City. It was the first purpose-built GAA stadium.
- 1984: The Gaelic Athletic Association's centenary year. The All-Ireland Senior Hurling Championship Final between Cork and Offaly was played in Semple Stadium, Thurles.
- 1993: A grand plan to completely re-construct Croke Park was launched.
- 1996: The new Cusack Stand was opened.
- 1997: The "back door" system was introduced into the All-Ireland Senior Hurling Championship. The first All-Ireland Senior Hurling Championship Final between two sides from the same province took place between Clare and Tipperary, both of Munster.
- 1998: Offaly became the first side to win the All-Ireland Senior Hurling Championship by springing through the "back door".
- 1999: The Gaelic Players Association was founded.
- 2001: Rule 21 barring members of the British Army or the RUC from playing GAA was deleted.
- 2001: The "back door" system was introduced into the All-Ireland Senior Football Championship. Galway became the first football side to win the All-Ireland Senior Football Championship by springing through the "back door".
- 2002: The redeveloped Cusack, Canal End and Hogan Stands were officially opened.
- 2003: The first All-Ireland Senior Football Championship Final between two sides from the same province took place between Tyrone and Armagh, both of Ulster.
- 2004: The first Tommy Murphy Cup was played.
- 2005: The first Christy Ring Cup and Nicky Rackard Cup were held.
- 2005: The re-development of Hill 16 was completed and is functional for the All-Ireland Senior Championship Finals.
- 2005: The GAA relaxed Rule 42, which gave temporary permission for soccer and rugby internationals to be played at Croke Park from 2007 while Lansdowne Road, the home of both sports, was being rebuilt.
- 2007: The first game to be played in Croke Park under lights. The largest league attendance ever of 81,678 was also recorded – Dublin are beaten 0–10 to 0–11 by Tyrone.
- 2009: The 125th anniversary of the GAA was commemorated with a floodlit National Football League opening match between Dublin and Tyrone.
- 2013: Hawk-Eye was introduced for Championship matches at Croke Park. It was first used to confirm that Offaly substitute Peter Cunningham's attempted point had gone wide 10 minutes into the second half of a game against Kildare.
- 2013: The first Friday night game in the history of the Championship occurred – a first round qualifier between Carlow and Laois.
