= Chartres (disambiguation) =

Chartres is a city in Eure-et-Loir, France. Chartres may also refer to:

== Places ==
- Chartres Cathedral, Chartres, Eure-et-Loir, France
- Chartres, Falkland Islands, a settlement on West Falkland
- Chartres River, a river on West Falkland

== Ships ==
- MV Chartres, a train ferry in service 1973–93

== People with the name ==
- John Chartres, British historian
- Richard Chartres (born 1947), British former bishop and life peer
- Vivien Chartres (1893–1941), British violinist and child prodigy
- Mademoiselle de Chartres (disambiguation), a title given to a daughter of the King of France

== See also ==
- Siege of Chartres (disambiguation) - Chartres has been besieged more than once
