= Jennie Wyse Power =

Irish politician and businesswoman (1858–1941)

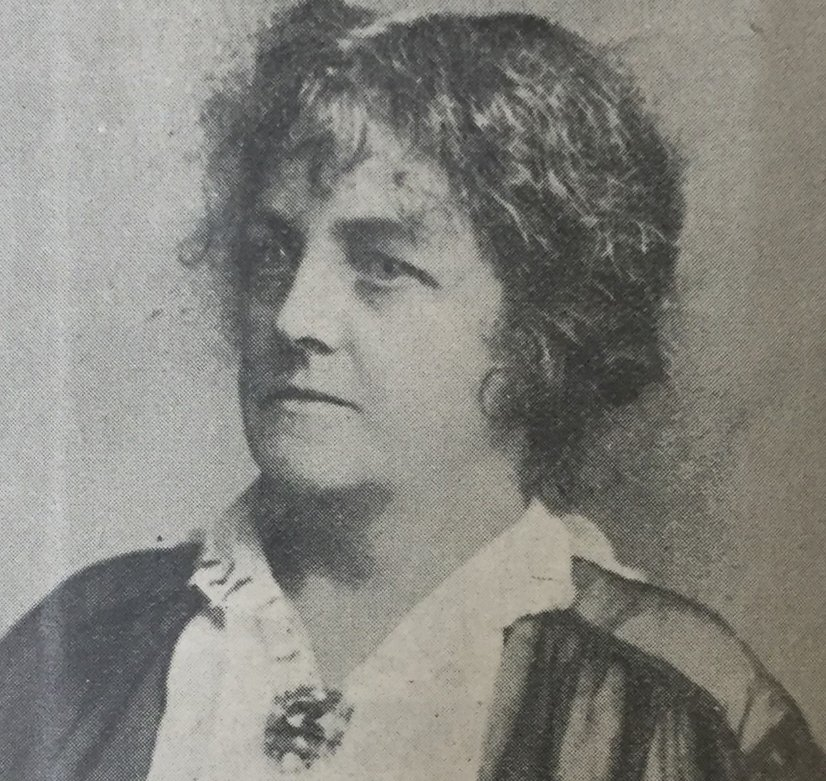
- Wyse Power in 1920

Senator
- In office 11 December 1922 – 29 May 1936

Vice President of Sinn Féin
- In office 1911–Unknown
- Leader: Arthur Griffith
- Preceded by: Arthur Griffith; Bulmer Hobson
- Succeeded by: Michael O'Flanagan; Arthur Griffith

Personal details
- Born: Jane O'Toole; 1 May 1858 Baltinglass, County Wicklow, Ireland
- Died: 5 January 1941 (aged 82) Dublin, Ireland
- Resting place: Glasnevin Cemetery, Dublin, Ireland
- Party: Sinn Féin; Cumann na nGaedheal; Independent; Fianna Fáil
- Spouse: John Wyse Power (m. 1883)
- Children: 4
- Occupation: Politician; Activist; Vegetarian Restrauteur

Jane Wyse Power (Irish: Siobhán Bean an Phaoraigh; née O'Toole; 1 May 1858 – 5 January 1941) was an Irish nationalist, feminist, politician, and businesswoman who was a founder member of Sinn Féin and also of Inghinidhe na hÉireann. She rose to become one of the most important women of the struggle against British rule. Wyse Power supported the Anglo-Irish Treaty and gave up her position as president of Cumann na mBan to form a new organisation called Cumann na Saoirse. She later held several senior posts in the Dáil.

== Early life ==
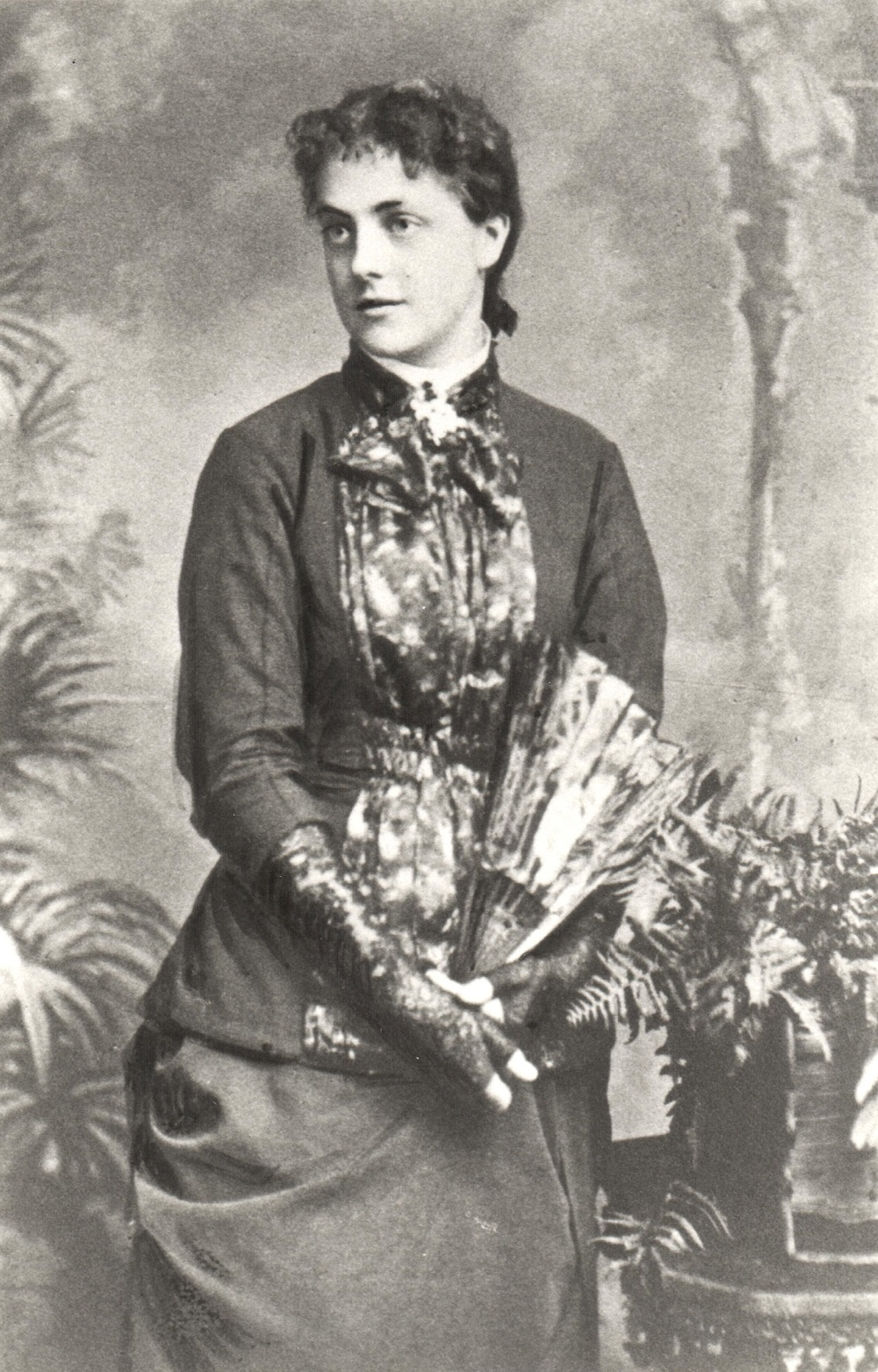
Wyse Power as a young woman

Born Jane O'Toole in Baltinglass, County Wicklow in 1858, the daughter of Edward O'Toole and Mary Norton. When she was only two years old her father sold the business and moved to Dublin. Her family were strongly Nationalist and provided refuge for several Fenians. Before she was twenty she and her four siblings lost both their parents to illness. In 1881 she became involved in politics for the first time by joining the Ladies' Land League that year. She was an intimate of Anna Parnell and an admirer of Anna's brother, Nationalist Member of Parliament and Leader of the Home Rule Party, Charles Stewart Parnell.

During her time in the Ladies' Land League she met her husband, John Wyse Power, the then editor of the Leinster Leader newspaper and a member of the Irish Republican Brotherhood. He was also one of the founder members of the Gaelic Athletic Association (GAA). They married on 5 July 1883 and lived in Naas, County Kildare.

The family moved to Dublin in 1885 after John secured a position with the national Freeman's Journal. They had four children together. Catherine (born 1885), who died in infancy; Maura, called “Máire” (born 1887); Anne, called “Nancy” (born 1889); and Charles (born 1892). Charles was born five months after the death of Parnell and was christened Charles Stewart Wyse Power in his memory. In that same year she published Words of the Dead Chief, with an introduction from Anna Parnell, containing a selection of extracts from Parnell's speeches. The Wyse Powers appear as the Wyse Nolans in Ulysses by James Joyce.

After Parnell's fall from grace and death, she and her husband were disillusioned and stayed out of politics for some time. She remained an active member of the Dublin Women's Suffrage Association, however, although was never very prominent in the organisation. In 1899 the family moved to the city centre and she set up in business at 21 Henry Street calling her shop the Irish Farm Produce Company where she sold eggs, butter, cream, honey, confectionery and all-Irish produce. The business included a vegetarian restaurant with tea and luncheon rooms.

In 1900, she was elected as one of the four vice-presidents of Inghinidhe na hÉireann. In 1903 she was elected as a Poor Law guardian for North Dublin, and served until 1911, when she lost her seat. She had vocally criticised public housing and public health conditions throughout her tenure as a Poor Law guardian. Her restaurant proved attractive to many nationalists of her generation in the Gaelic League and founders of Sinn Féin. At the inaugural meeting of Sinn Féin she was included as a resident member of the executive. Arthur Griffith called the women a "passive resistance, boycotting and non-violent agitation". But Sinn Féin would prove an exception to that rule.

In 1908 she expanded her business by acquiring new premises at 21 Lower Camden Street, again emphasising the sale of solely Irish produce and a vegetarian restaurant. By 1912, Wyse Power was a Vice-President of Sinn Féin: on 5 April 1914 at Wynne's Hotel, Dublin she became a founder member of Cumann na mBan and was an active member of the Central Branch. On 31 October 1914, she was elected the first President of Cumann na mBan.

== Irish revolutionary period ==
The signing of the Proclamation of the Irish Republic took place in Wyse Power's house in Henry Street. During the Easter Rising the house was destroyed by fire. The records of the Ladies' Land League which had been in her custody for 30 years were destroyed in the blaze. After the Rising she and her daughter, Nancy, helped re-organise Cumann na mBan and distribute funds to families suffering hardships due to the Rising. These funds had been sent by Clan na Gael in the United States. At this time she was succeeded as President of Cumann na mBan by her close friend, Countess Markievicz, then in prison.

Wyse Power joined the Irish Women's Franchise League at this time. In the period after the Rising, Sinn Féin's military wing expanded rapidly to 600 branches of Volunteers around the country recruiting women as well as men; Wyse Power was one of the executive sent to actively prepare female recruits. She helped organise the nationwide anti-conscription protest Lá na mBan on 9 June 1918, which resulted in an influx of members to Cumann na mBan.

Wyse Power did not stand for election at the 1918 general election, but she and other Cumann na mBan members successfully campaigned for Markievicz, the Sinn Féin candidate in Dublin St Patrick's.

In 1919, she was appointed Treasurer of the Sinn Féin Executive, when she recorded in Leabhar na mBan, their aims to include 'all shades of nationalist thought'. At the 1920 Dublin Corporation election, she was elected for the Inns Quay – Rotunda District as one of five women members onto Dublin City Council, although she had some difficulty taking her seat when the clerk at first refused to let her sign her name in Irish.

Throughout much of the latter half of 1919 a room in her vegetarian restaurant in Henry Street, Dublin served as the Headquarters of the Irish Volunteers. In 1991, the 1916–21 Club marked the home and business premises of Wyse Power at 21 Henry Street with a plaque. Upon Cosgrave's arrest in June 1920, she was one of a new Dáil Commission appointed to overcome financial difficulties in Local Government.

She was chosen by Collins for use in his extensive spy networks throughout Ireland and abroad. By the end of 1921 Power was convinced that supporting the treaty would mean the need to leave Cumann na mBan and form a separate organisation: "It is to be regretted that this splendid force of women should have been the first body to repudiate the National Parliament, and thus initiate a policy, which has had such disastrous results. The decision had the further effect of limiting Cumann na nBan to purely military work."

Wyse Power had supported Parnell's efforts to achieve Home Rule and supported the 1912 Home Rule Bill. As such it was natural that she would support the Anglo-Irish Treaty, although she was one of the few nationalist women to do so. However, she retained friendships on the Anti-Treaty side. Along with other Pro-Treaty women she helped set up Cumann na Saoirse – The League for Freedom – to replace Cumann na mBan in March 1922.

=== Seanad Éireann ===
She was appointed to the Irish Free State Seanad Éireann as a Cumann na nGaedheal member in December 1922 by the President of the Executive Council, W. T. Cosgrave. She was one of four women elected or appointed to the first Seanad in 1922. The other women were Alice Stopford Green, Ellen Cuffe, Countess of Desart, and Eileen Costello.

During the Irish Civil War, the property of Free State Senators was often attacked by anti-Treaty irregulars. On 10 December 1922, her premises in Camden Street was bombed with considerable damage done. She complained in December 1922, that Mary MacSwiney and others were particularly "very free in their criticisms" – which stunned Power and many others in the rank and file, most of whom were pro-treaty.

In 1922, only Wyse Power and Colonel Maurice George Moore opposed the appointment of Lord Glenavy as Cathaoirleach, as Lord Glenavy was a Unionist. Wyse Power served on the Cumann na nGaedheal Ard Chomhairle but her time in the Seanad saw her become increasingly disillusioned with Government policy particularly over the debacle of the Boundary Commission. The last meeting of Cumann na nGaedheal she attended was on 1 December 1925 and thereafter she sat as an independent senator.

With the entry of Fianna Fáil into both the Dáil and Seanad she found herself more regularly voting with that party in divisions along with Colonel Moore and Senator James Charles Dowdall. In 1934, her close friend, Seán T. O'Kelly, had her daughter, Nancy, transferred from the Department of Industry and Commerce to the Department of Local Government to act as his Private Secretary. O'Kelly was probably the one who persuaded Wyse Power to join Fianna Fáil that year and stand for the party in the 1934 Seanad Election where she was re-elected for nine years and would serve until the Seanad was abolished in 1936. She opposed those Conditions of Employment Bill which she felt discriminated against women.

== Death ==
On 5 January 1941, aged 82, she died at her home in Dublin, and was interred in Glasnevin Cemetery with her husband and daughter, Máire (who predeceased her). Her funeral was attended by many from both sides of the Dáil and the former revolutionary movement.

== Writings ==
- Words of the dead chief: Extracts from speeches of Charles Stewart Parnell. Compiled by Jennie Wyse Power (1892).

Party political offices
Preceded by Bulmer Hobson	Vice President of Sinn Féin; 1911–? with Thomas Kelly	Succeeded by Michael O'Flanagan
