= Nancy Wyse Power =

Irish republican (1889–1963)

- Born: Ann Wyse Power; 16 November 1889; Dublin, Ireland
- Died: 27 December 1963 (aged 74); Dublin, Republic of Ireland

Ann "Nancy" Wyse Power (16 November 1889 – 27 December 1963), was an Irish celticist, diplomat and nationalist.

== Early life and education ==
She was born Ann Wyse Power in Dublin, 16 November 1889, to John Wyse Power and Jane O'Toole. Her father was a civil servant and one of the founding members of the Gaelic Athletic Association while her mother was an Irish activist, feminist, politician and businesswoman. Her family ran a restaurant in Henry Street and leading Irish nationalists were regular visitors. Her sister, Máire, was also a Celtic scholar.

Wyse Power joined the Gaelic League in 1902 and was on the Women's committee of Sinn Féin. She went to University College Dublin (UCD) where she graduated with a degree in 1912 in Celtic Studies. She followed the bachelor's degree with a doctorate in the University of Bonn, Germany. But in 1915 she was forced to return to Ireland because of the First World War. It took until 1920 before she was able to finish, studying under Julius Pokorny. She had specialised in Celtic Philology.

== Activism and career ==
When in Ireland in 1915 Wyse Power joined Cumann na mBan. She was active in the week leading up to the Easter Rising and knew that the rising was due to go ahead. Bulmer Hobson asked her to be a courier and she carried messages including to Terence MacSwiney in Cork and to Carlow on Easter Monday. She worked out of the General Post Office, Dublin during Easter week carrying messages and moving provisions.

In 1917, she, with her mother, worked to provide relief for families who lost members or had members in prison. Late in 1917 she was appointed one of the secretaries of Cumann na nBan and helped to rebuild the organisation to over 500 branches by 1920. One of the events she was involved in was Lá na mBan, 9 June 1918. She was also recommended by Constance Markievicz to substitute for her if the leadership of Sinn Féin was arrested. Wyse Power was active throughout the Irish war of Independence.

Wyse Power was recruited by the new Dáil's foreign service to work with their German affairs. By April 1921 she had set up the offices of the Irish mission in Berlin, where she was also involved in restarting the Irish Bulletin. John Chartres was later leader of the political office, and Charles Bewley was leader of the trade mission in Berlin, and he suggested that both Wyse Power and Chartres had anti-Treaty sympathies and had both of them recalled. The newly formed Irish Department of Finance requested that Power produce vouchers for expenditures since May 1920. Power explained that "in the conditions then prevalent in Berlin, bribery was one of the chief items of expenditure and one does not get vouchers for that!"

In fact, Wyse Power had been one of only three Cumann na mBan women to approve the Treaty (along with her mother, Jane, and Mrs Richard Mulcahy). At the time of the Treaty debate she suggested a compromise: that Cumann na mBan reaffirm its allegiance to the Republic “but realising that the Treaty... will, if accepted by the Irish people be a big step along the road to that end, we declare that we will not work obstructively against those who support the Treaty”. She joined the Department of Industry and Commerce, and worked there from 1923 to 1932 when Fianna Fáil swept into power on a change of government and then Seán T. O'Kelly requested her to work in the Department of Local Government and Public Health as his personal private secretary. As one of the first women to get to the position of principal officer in the civil service, Wyse Power acted as an advocate for women.

She also worked as a governor of the Dublin Institute for Advanced Studies, a position to which she was appointed in 1940.

Wyse Power retired from the civil service in 1954. She was president of the UCD Women Graduates' Association from 1959 to 1962. She died on 27 December 1963, aged 74.
