= Hayes' Hotel =

Hotel in Thurles, County Tipperary, Ireland

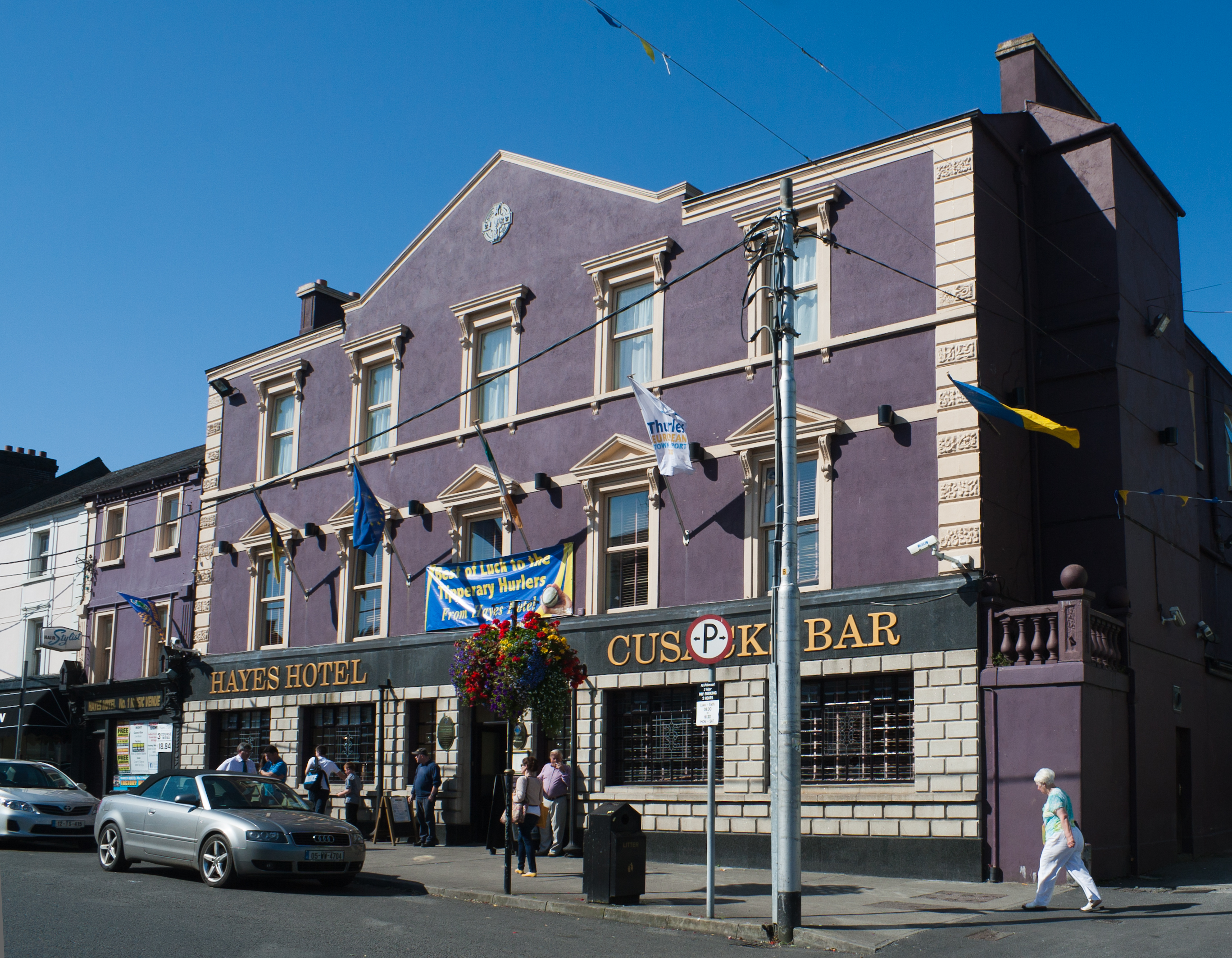
Hayes' Hotel in Liberty Square, Thurles

Hayes' Hotel is a hotel in Liberty Square, Thurles, County Tipperary, Ireland. In 1884 the Gaelic Athletic Association was founded in the billiards room of the hotel.

== History ==
The hotel traded under the name 'The Star and Garter' in the 18th century. The hotel was purchased in the 1830s by William Boyton and became known as 'Boyton's Hotel'. In the 1870s the hotel was purchased by Miss Eliza J. Hayes and thus became known as Hayes' Commercial and Family Hotel.

On 1 November 1884, a group of Irishmen gathered in the hotel billiard room to formulate a plan and establish an organisation to foster and preserve Ireland's unique games and athletic pastimes. And so was founded one of the world's greatest amateur associations, the GAA. The architects and founding members were Michael Cusack, Maurice Davin, Joseph Bracken, Thomas St George McCarthy, P.J. Ryan of Tipperary, John Wise-Power, and John McKay. On 18 July 1974 the Ladies' Gaelic Football Association was also formed at the hotel.

The hotel is a popular venue on the day of the Munster final when it is held in Thurles, especially when the final is between traditional rivals Tipperary and Cork.

In April 2013, Hayes' Hotel went into receivership. The hotel was to remain open following the appointment of receivers, however they didn't offer room sales.

In October 2014, Fethard native Jack Halley took ownership of the Hotel, buying it at auction for €650,000.

== See also ==
- History of the Gaelic Athletic Association
