= Edward Bennet =

Irish Gaelic games administrator, second president of the GAA

Edward Bennet (1845 – 24 November 1910), of Newmarket-on-Fergus, was the second president of the Gaelic Athletic Association (1887–1888).

A participant in the 1867 Rising, Bennet was involved in athletics in Co. Clare, as well as the Land League and Home Rule movements.

Bennet became the first chairman of the Clare GAA county committee.

By 1887, the GAA had become split along political lines. Bennet received the nomination of the IRB, and was elected president. His presidency was brief, however, lasting only two months before Archbishop Croke intervened to heal the split. Maurice Davin was re-elected, and Bennet lost not only his presidency, but his place on the Clare county board.

This article incorporates text available under the CC BY 3.0 license.

Sporting positions
Preceded by Maurice Davin	President of the Gaelic Athletic Association; 1887–1888	Succeeded by Maurice Davin
