= GAA Confidential =

2007 book by Darragh McManus

- Author: Darragh McManus
- Language: English
- Subject: Sport
- Publisher: Hodder Headline Ireland
- Publication date: April 2007
- Publication place: Ireland
- Media type: Print (Paperback)
- ISBN: 0-340-93808-0

GAA Confidential (Everything you never knew you wanted to know about Gaelic games) is a humorous sports book by Darragh McManus, an Irish journalist and author. It was published by Hodder Headline Ireland in April 2007.

The book takes a broad look at the Gaelic Athletic Association, and attendant Irish culture, and is divided into sections: The Introduction, The History, The Set-up, The Games, The Competitions, The Fans, The Media, The Arts & Culture, The Look, and The Other Stuff That Wouldn't Fit Anywhere Else.

GAA Confidential received generally favourable reviews on publication, including: “Perhaps the funniest, most cultured book ever written about our national sports” (Irish Independent); “Hilarious…an eclectic collection of anecdotes by an immensely talented writer” (Sunday Independent); “Flip, smart, ironic and breezy…by turns a miscellany, polemic, social history and work of satire” (Sunday Business Post); “A book that every GAA fan should have…read it” (www.anfearrua.ie); "Guaranteed to raise a smile” (Sunday Tribune). It was nominated for the 2007 William Hill Irish Sportsbook of the Year award.

Darragh McManus currently writes freelance for the Irish Independent and The Guardian.
