= National Handball Centre =

Sports venue in Dublin, Ireland

National Handball Centre Ionad Náisiúnta Liathróid Láimhe
- Full name: GAA National Handball Centre
- Address: Sackville Avenue, Dublin 3, Ireland
- Location: Croke Park
- Owner: Páirc an Chrócaigh Teoranta
- Capacity: 500 (4-Wall Showcourt), 200 (60x30 Showcourt)
- Public transit: Drumcondra railway station, Dublin Bus

Construction
- Cost: €11.5 million

Tenants
- Gaelic Athletic Association; GAA Handball; Local community groups

Website
- www.gaahandball.ie

The National Handball Centre (Irish: Ionad Náisiúnta Liathróid Láimhe) is an indoor handball facility located on the Croke Park campus in Dublin, Ireland. It serves as both the national venue for All-Ireland Gaelic handball finals and as the headquarters of GAA Handball, the sport's national governing body. The new centre replaces the old Croke Park Handball Centre that was built in 1970.

== History ==
GAA Handball were granted planning approval in late 2017 to build a National Handball Centre at Croke Park.

The new National Handball Centre, located at the southeast corner of the stadium on Sackville Avenue, was close to completion as of January 2021, with the final minor stages of building delayed due to the COVID-19 pandemic. As of May 2020, the centre was being used for COVID-19 testing by Ireland's national health service, the Health Service Executive.

While the centre's official opening was delayed due to both the COVID-19 pandemic as well as the final completion of remaining building works, the centre had a 'soft' opening in December 2021, allowing registered players to book the courts through Croke Park.

The European 1-Wall Tour "EliteStop" took place in the Centre on Saturday 10 and Sunday 11 December 2022. The GAA Handball O'Neills-sponsored All-Ireland 4-Wall Senior Doubles semi-finals took place on 2 April 2023, with the finals taking place the following weekend.

The 2023 All Ireland Senior Softball Finals are due to take place on Saturday 17 June 2023 in the 60x30 showcourt in the centre.

== Facilities ==
The new centre is planned to contain three 4-Wall handball courts - including a three-sided glass wall show court with amphitheatre style seating for a capacity of 500 spectators, a 60x30 show court with seating capacity for 200 spectators and three 1-Wall courts. The centre includes offices for GAA Handball staff, a bar and cafe as well as a community centre.

== Ownership and operation ==
The National Handball Centre building and the site it occupies are owned by Páirc an Chrócaigh Teoranta, the firm that oversees the running of Croke Park. The centre is expected to be managed and operated by a joint venture company under a long-term lease. This company comprises a partnership between the GAA and the 'Irish Handball Sports Centre', a local community group. According to the GAA, "its primary purpose is the promotion of handball" and "it can never be repurposed" or "changed in any way or indeed sold without GAA consent".
