= Máire Wyse Power =

Irish Celtic scholar (1887–1916)

- Born: Maura Wyse Power; 9 December 1887; Fairview, Dublin
- Died: 19 July 1916 (aged 28); Sandycove, Dublin
- Occupation: Scholar

Maura "Máire" Wyse Power (9 December 1887 – 19 July 1916) was an Irish Celtic scholar.

== Biography ==
Maura "Máire" Wyse Power was born at 7 Royal Terrace (now Inverness Road) Fairview, Dublin on 9 December 1887. She was one of four children of restaurateur Jennie and journalist John Wyse Power who were both active nationalists. Her younger sister was Nancy, who would also become a Celtic scholar. The family were friendly with that of James Joyce, and Wyse Power is believed to have inspired the character Mary Elizabeth Cleary in Stephen Hero.

She attended Loreto College, Stephen's Green and then University College Dublin (UCD), one of a small number of women permitted to attend at the time. She graduated with a first-class honours degree in Celtic studies. She had developed a love of Irish during numerous family holidays to the Gaeltacht at Ring, County Waterford. Along with her sister and brother, Wyse Power was a member of Conradh na Gaeilge, winning a prize for Irish at senior grade in 1905. Following her graduation from UCD, she won a travelling scholarship, going first to the University of Marburg, Germany, and then to the University of Freiburg, studying under Rudolf Thurneysen.

Her 1912 work on a fifteenth-century treatise on astronomy in Irish, completed under the supervision of Osborn Bergin, was chosen to be published by the Irish Texts Society. It was published as An Irish Astronomical Tract in 1914 alongside an English translation and commentary, and established her as a Celtic scholar.

She earned a living as a part-time examiner for the Government Intermediate Board whilst conducting her own research. She lost this job in 1916, as she was accused of sympathies with those who took part in the 1916 Rising. She was reinstated, but worked extremely hard to provide the most accurate examination results. It was this pressure at work that is blamed for a steep decline in her health.

Wyse Power died on 19 July 1916 at the home of a family friend in Sandycove, Dublin after a short illness. Her death was recorded as resulting from "neurasthenia and cardiac asthma", but her mother's biographer, Maire O'Neill, speculated that this may have been a euphemism for tuberculosis. She is buried in Glasnevin Cemetery. Her parents erected a memorial plaque to her in University Church, St Stephen's Green. Her article on Irish historical poems from the Book of Lismore, "Cnuche Cnoc os cionn Life", was published posthumously in the Zeitschrift für Celtische Philologie (1917).
