= Lá na mBan =

Lá na mBan (Women's Day) took place across Ireland on 9 June 1918. It was a mass anti-conscription protest organised by Cumann na mBan, the Irish Women Workers Union (IWWU) and other women's organisations, in which women pledged not to do the jobs of men should they be conscripted into the British Army during World War I. Thousands of Irish women signed the pledge on 9 June and subsequent days.

The pledge read:

Because the enforcement of conscription on any people without their consent is tyranny, we are resolved to resist the conscription of Irishmen. We will not fill the places of men deprived of their work through refusing enforced military service. We will do all in our power to help the families of men who suffer through refusing enforced military service.

The names of signatories were recorded in ledgers, though few of these records still exist. The pledge could also be signed on a decorated certificate, one of which is held in the collection of the National Museum of Ireland. Estimates suggest that two thirds of Irish women signed the Lá na mBan pledge.

== Background ==
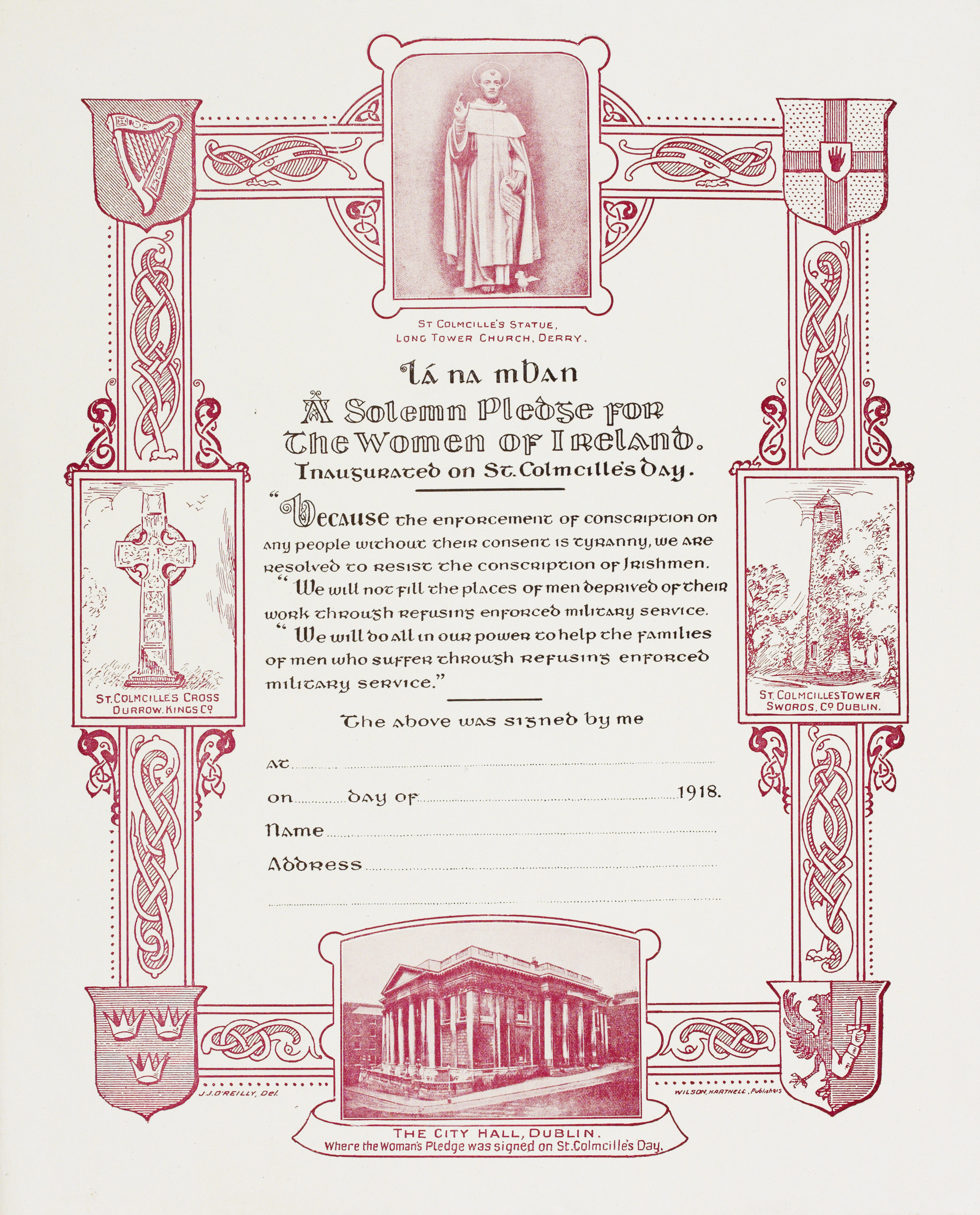
Lá na mBan pledge certificate, held in the National Museum of Ireland collection

Lá na mBan was a response to the passing of the Military Service Bill in April 1918, which extended conscription to Ireland. Irish MPs walked out of Westminster in protest. A subsequent meeting held in the Mansion House, Dublin was attended by political parties and nationalist organisations, but not Cumann na mBan or other women's organisations. A pledge was adopted by those present to "resist conscription by the most effective means at our disposal".

The Irish bishops agreed that the pledge could be taken at church doors before mass on Sunday, 21 April 1918. Hundreds of thousands of signatures were collected on the day. On 20 April, the Irish Trade Unions Congress (ITUC) called a general strike against conscription. On 23 April 1918 the strike shut down much of the country other than staunchly unionist areas in Ulster.

A separate pledge was taken by IWWU and Cumann na mBan not to "fill the places of men deprived of their work through enforced military service". A banner reading "Conscription! No woman must take a man’s job" was hung from the window of the Irish Women’s Franchise League (IWFL) headquarters.

A women's meeting was held in the Mansion House on 27 April. The Women’s Day Committee was set up by the Irishwomen’s International League, led by Alice Stopford Green, and included Louie Bennett, Nancy O’Rahilly, Helen Laird, and Helen Chenevix. They decided on 9 June, the feast of St Colmcille, one of the patron saints of Ireland, for the Women’s Day anti-conscription protest. Representatives of Cumann na mBan, the IWFL, the IWWU and other women’s unions were invited onto the Committee. According to Nancy Wyse Power, Cumann na mBan then took over the leadership of the project.

The event was publicised with leaflets and banners with the wording:

"No Conscription
Now! Or after the harvest.
No economic pressure!
Lá na mBan.
The Woman's Day.
Sunday, June 9th.
For Home and Country.
IRISHWOMEN,
Stand by your countrymen
In resisting conscription."

== Lá na mBan ==
On 9 June, more than 2,400 IWWU members and 700 members of Cumann na mBan in uniform converged on City Hall. The pledge was signed by the women of the Irish Citizen Army, members of the IWFL, National Federation of Women Workers, Dublin Tailoresses and other unions. Delegates also attended from various convents. About 40,000 signatures were collected from women across Dublin.

The Women’s Day Committee asked women across Ireland to sign the pledge and then "form a procession to a church or place of pilgrimage, or local memorial of national history". In Dungarvan, large numbers signed the pledge at the town hall before marching in procession to the Parish Church. In Derry, women “marched from St Columb’s Hall to Long Tower Church where devotions were conducted”. Pledge signing went on for weeks after Lá na mBan, with Cork Cumann na mBan members signing the pledge on 7 July.

In the end, it is estimated that two thirds of Irishwomen signed the anti-conscription pledge.

== Commemorations ==
Lá na mBan was commemorated as part of the Decade of Centenaries. On 9 June 2018, an event took place at the Mansion House, Dublin to mark its centenary. The event was hosted the SIPTU trade union and featured Sabina Higgins, wife of Uachtaran na hEireann (President of Ireland) Michael D Higgins, Micheline Sheehy Skeffington, granddaughter of IWFL leader Hanna Sheehy Skeffington, trade unionists, women’s rights campaigners, and historians.

The IWWU ran a competition inviting people to modernise the Women’s Day/Lá na mBan 59-word pledge to reflect issues concerning women in the Ireland of 2018. The winners were the first to sign a new 2018 pledge book in City Hall on 9 June 2018 and received a framed copy of their pledge, based on the design of the original 1918 Pledge. A banner celebrating Lá na mBan banner was hung on Liberty Hall in Dublin from 5 June 2018.

The only surviving ledger, with 1,000 names of women from Kilkenny, was displayed by the Kilkenny Archaeological Society to mark the centenary. The stories of some of the women have been collated on their website as part of a Lá na mBan project.
