= Maurice Davin =

Gaelic games administrator

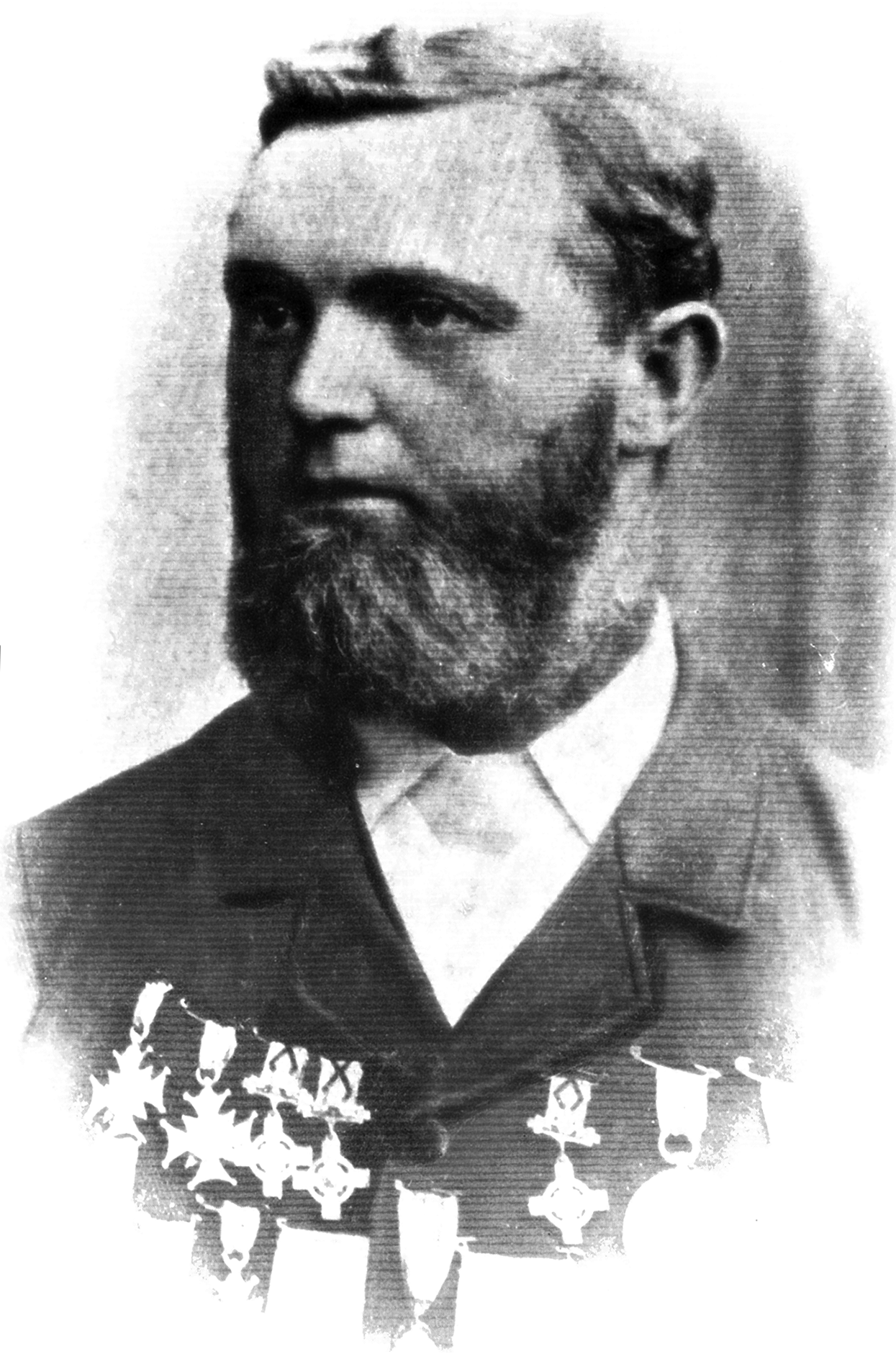
- Born: 29 June 1842; Carrick-on-Suir, Ireland
- Died: 27 January 1927 (aged 84); Carrick-on-Suir, County Tipperary, Ireland
- Occupations: farmer and former athlete

Maurice Davin (29 June 1842 – 27 January 1927) was an Irish farmer who became co-founder of the Gaelic Athletic Association. He was also the first President of the GAA and the only man ever to serve two terms as president.

== Sports ==
Davin was born in Carrick-on-Suir, the eldest of 4 athlete brothers He became an extremely talented athlete and achieved international fame in the 1870s when he held numerous world records for running, hurdling, jumping and weight-throwing.

Maurice won the shot put and hammer throw titles at the 1881 AAA Championships and his brother Patrick Davin won the high jump and long jump events at the same AAA Championships.

== GAA founding ==
From 1887 Davin actively campaigned for a body to control Irish athletics. Athletics in Ireland at the time was controlled directly by an English association which excluded the masses from most competitions.

Davin wrote "the laws under which athletic sports are held in Ireland were designed mainly for the guidance of Englishmen, and they do not deal at all with the characteristic sports and pastimes of the Irish race. Irish football is a great game" he wrote, "but there are no rules for either hurling or football and they are often dangerous."

Together with Michael Cusack, of Carron on the eastern fringe of The Burren, County Clare, he called a meeting in Hayes's Commercial Hotel, Thurles, County Tipperary, on 1 November 1884, and founded the Gaelic Athletic Association (GAA). In that meeting they established "a Gaelic athletic association for the preservation and cultivation of national pastimes". As far as we know, only six others attended the historic meeting.

Davin was elected president and Cusack became its first secretary. John Wyse Power and John McKay were also elected secretaries. Later, Thomas Croke, Archbishop of Cashel and Emly, Michael Davitt and Charles Stewart Parnell became patrons. The following year standardised rules were set for hurling, football, weight throwing, jumping, running, walking and cycling. Séamus Ó Riain described Davin as "the rock on which the Association survived turbulent waves".

== Legacy ==
Many top games including the 1904 All-Ireland Senior Hurling Championship Final between Kilkenny and Cork were played on Davin's farm. The Davin Stand in Croke Park, Dublin, is named in his honour, as are some GAA clubs throughout the country, including Carrick Davins in Tipperary.

Gaelic games
Preceded by New position	President of the Gaelic Athletic Association; 1884–1887	Succeeded by Edward Bennet
Preceded by Edward Bennet	President of the Gaelic Athletic Association; 1888–1889	Succeeded by Peter Kelly
