= Siege of Chartres =

Siege of Chartres may refer to:

- Siege of Chartres (911)
- Siege of Chartres (1360)
- Siege of Chartres (1568)
