= Mademoiselle de Chartres =

Mademoiselle de Chartres may refer to one of the following:

- Marie Anne d'Orléans (1652–1656) daughter of Gaston, Duke of Orléans and Marguerite de Lorraine
- Élisabeth Charlotte d'Orléans (1676–1744) daughter of Philippe I, Duke of Orléans and Elizabeth Charlotte of the Palatinate
- Louise Adélaïde d'Orléans (1698–1743) second daughter of Philippe II, Duke of Orléans and Françoise-Marie de Bourbon
- Louise Diane d'Orléans (1716–1736) youngest daughter of Philippe II, Duke of Orléans and Françoise-Marie de Bourbon
- Françoise d'Orléans (1777–1782) daughter of Louis Philippe II, Duke of Orléans and Louise Marie Adélaïde de Bourbon
- La Princesse de Clèves, character of the French novel published anonymously in 1678 by Madame de La Fayette
