= John Chartres =

John Anthony Chartres (born January 1946) is the former professor of economic and social history at the University of Leeds. He is a specialist in the economic history of agriculture in England.

== Selected publications ==
=== Books ===
- Internal trade in England, 1500-1700. Macmillan, London, 1977. ISBN 0333183584
- Pre-Industrial Britain. Basil Blackwell, Oxford, 1994. ISBN 063118144X (Editor & contributor)
- Agricultural Markets and Trade, 1500-1750. Cambridge University Press, 2003. (Editor)

=== Other ===
- "English Landed Society and the Servants Tax of 1777" in N. Harte & R. Quinault (Eds.) (1996) Land and Society in Britain, 1700-1914: Essays in Honour of F. M. L. Thompson, Manchester, Manchester University Press, pp. 34–56.
- "Foires et Marchés en Angleterre de 1500 à 1850" in C. Desplat (Ed.) (1996) Foires et Marchés dans les Campagnes de l'Europe médiévale et moderne, Actes des XIVes Journées Internationales d'Histoire de l'Abbaye de Flaran, Presses Universitaires du Mirail, Toulouse, pp. 153–175.
- "Leeds: Regional Distributive Centre of Luxuries in the later Eighteenth Century", Northern History, XXXVIl (2000), pp. 115–132.
- "Part IV: Trade, Commerce and Industry" in E.J.T. Collins (Ed.) (2000) The Agrarian History of England & Wales, VII, 1850-1914, Cambridge University Press, Cambridge, pp. 947–1225.
- "The Eighteenth-century English Inn: a transient "Golden Age" " in B. Kümin & B.A. Tlusty (Eds.) (2002) The World of the Tavern: Public Houses in Early Modern Europe, Ashgate, Aldershot, pp. 205-226.
- "Producers, crops and markets 1600-1800" in J. Broad (Ed.) (2009) A common agricultural heritage? Revising French and British rural divergence, Agricultural History Review, Supplement Series 5, British Agricultural History Society, Exeter, pp. 138–154.
