= John Wyse Power =

John Wyse Power (1859-1926), was a County Waterford born, journalist, newspaper editor and Irish nationalist. He was founding member of the Gaelic Athletic Association, and served as secretary of the GAA (1884-1887). He was involved in setting up the Dublin County Board of the GAA and served as its first chairman. He supported nationalist causes and organisations such as the Land League and Home Rule, and was a fluent Irish speaker and language activist.

== Early life and career ==
John Wyse Power was born at Knockhouse near Waterford City in 1859.

He worked sometime as a civil servant before leaving due to his nationalist ethos. He was reported to be a Fenian and member of the Irish Republican Brotherhood.

He succeeded Patrick Cahill in summer 1883, as the editor of the Leinster Leader.

In 1884 he answered the call of Micheal Cusack and participated in the founding of the GAA and was one of the seven to attend the meeting in Thurles founding the organisation. He resigned as secretary in 1887 following the decision to ban members of the RIC from joining and participating in the GAA.

== Personal life ==
During his time in the Land League he met his wife Jane (Jennie) O'Toole (a nationalist, feminist and founding member of Sinn Féin) and they married on 5 July 1883, and lived in Naas where the Leinster Leader was published. John and Jennie had four children, their youngest son was christened Charles Stewart Wyse Power, named after Parnell. Nancy and Máire worked with their parents as nationalists and both became celticists, with Nancy becoming one of Ireland's first senior women in the civil service.

He moved to Dublin in 1885 to work for the Freeman's Journal, and later he worked for the Daily Irish Independent.

John Wyse Power died in 1926 and is buried in Glasnevin Cemetery. In 2009 as part of the GAA 125 celebrations his gravestone was refurbished.
