= Joseph Kevin Bracken =

Irish politician (1852–1904)

JK Bracken
- Born: 1852; Templemore, County Tipperary, Ireland
- Died: 2 May 1904 (aged 52); Kilmallock, County Limerick, Ireland
- Burial place: Tankardstown Cemetery
- Occupation: Stonemason
- Known for: Founder of the Gaelic Athletic Association Member of the IRB
- Spouse(s): Agnes Mathews (m.1889–91, her death); Hannah Agnes Ryan (m.1897–1904, his death
- Children: 6 (2 by Mathews & 4 by Ryan)

Joseph Kevin Bracken (Irish: Seosamh Caoimhín Ó Breacáin; 1852–1904) commonly known as JK Bracken, was a local politician, Fenian and founder of the Gaelic Athletic Association. He is the son of Patrick Bracken (1830–1897) and Anne Bracken (née Hennessy; 1828–1893) of Templemore, Co. Tipperary. Father Patrick played a pre-GAA form of Irish football as early as 1847 for the Templemore citizen's team playing against the Templemore Garrison barrack team.

Bracken was one of the seven founding members of the Gaelic Athletic Association (GAA) in 1884. Bracken was also the first chairman of the Tipperary County Board, and served as vice-president of the GAA. One of the original seven signatories, he was the longest serving member on the GAA national executive. He was an elected representative and chairman of Templemore Urban District Council, and was a member of the oath-bound republican organisation the Irish Republican Brotherhood. Bracken's son, Brendan Bracken, was Minister of Information in Britain from 1941 to 1945 and created the modern Financial Times.

JK Brackens GAA Club in Templemore is named in his honour.
