= Gaelic Athletic Association =

Irish amateur sporting and cultural organisation

- Cumann Lúthchleas Gael
- Formation: 1 November 1884; 142 years ago in Thurles, County Tipperary, Ireland
- Founded at: Hayes' Hotel, Thurles
- Type: Sports association
- Purpose: The management and promotion of Gaelic games, and promotion of Irish culture and language
- Headquarters: Croke Park
- Location: Dublin, Ireland
- Region served: Worldwide
- Members: approx. 500,000 (2014)
- Official language: Irish
- President: Jarlath Burns
- Main organ: Central Council
- Staff: Limited full-time staff
- Website: gaa.ie

The Gaelic Athletic Association (GAA; Irish: Cumann Lúthchleas Gael [ˈkʊmˠən̪ˠ ˈl̪ˠuːˌçlʲasˠ ˈɡeːlˠ]; CLG) is an Irish international amateur sporting and cultural organisation, focused primarily on promoting indigenous Gaelic games and pastimes, which include the traditional Irish sports of hurling, camogie, Gaelic football, Gaelic handball, and GAA rounders. The association also promotes Irish music and dance, as well as the Irish language and it also promotes environmental stewardship through its Green Clubs initiative.

As of 2014, the organisation had over 500,000 members, and declared total revenues of €96.1 million in 2022. The Competitions Control Committee (CCC) of the Gaelic Athletic Association (GAA) governing bodies organise the fixture list of Gaelic games within a GAA county or provincial councils.

Gaelic football and hurling are the most popular activities promoted by the organisation, and the most popular sports in the Republic of Ireland in terms of attendance. Gaelic football is also the second most popular participation sport in Northern Ireland. The women's version of these games, ladies' Gaelic football and camogie, are organised by the independent but closely linked Ladies' Gaelic Football Association and the Camogie Association of Ireland, respectively. GAA Handball is the governing body for the sport of handball, while the other Gaelic sport, rounders, is managed by the GAA Rounders National Council (Irish: Comhairle Cluiche Corr na hÉireann).

Since its foundation in 1884, the association has grown to become a major influence in Irish sporting and cultural life, with considerable reach into communities throughout Ireland and among the Irish diaspora.

== Foundation and history ==
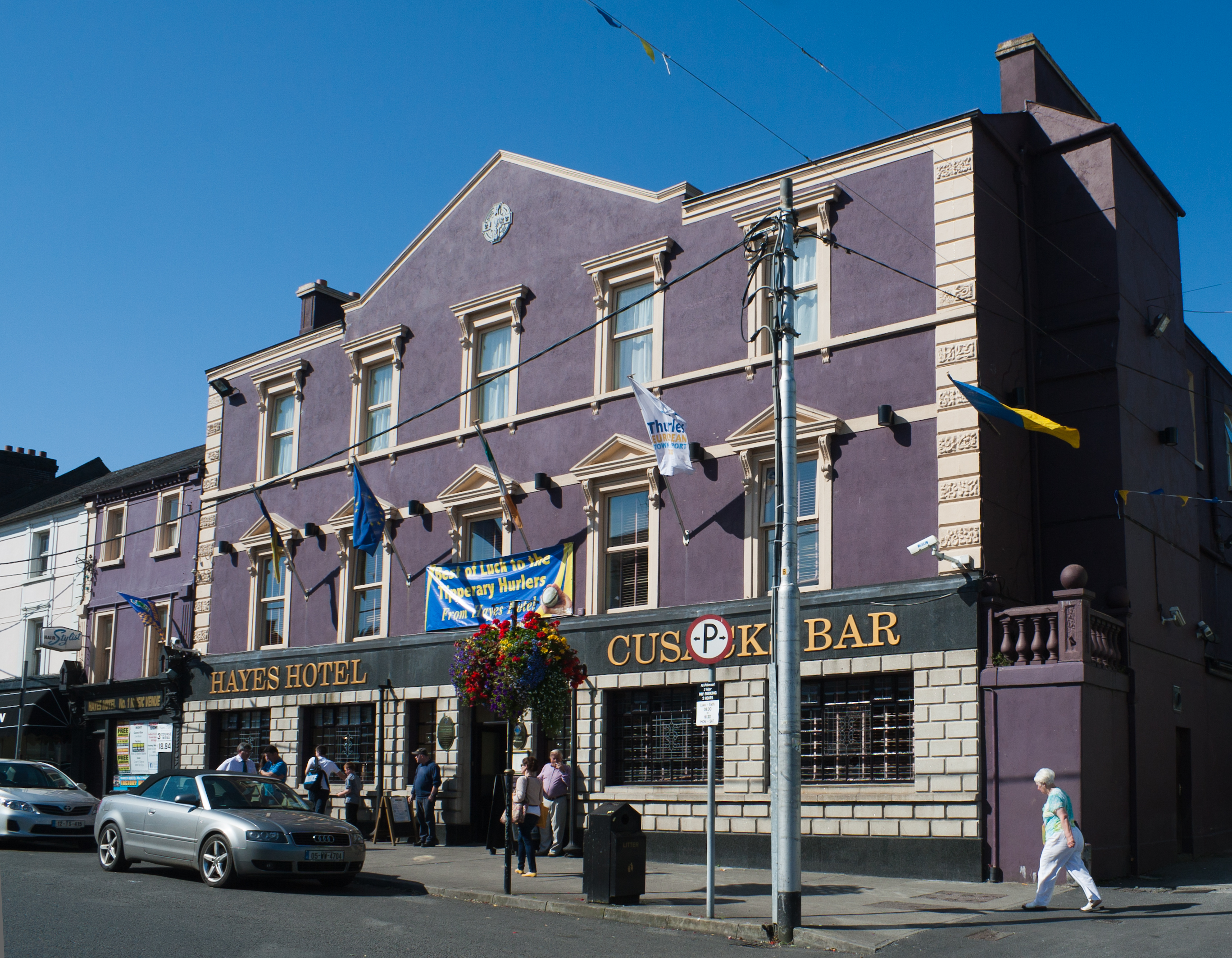
Hayes' Hotel in Thurles, foundation site of the organisation

On 1 November 1884, a group of Irishmen gathered in the Hayes' Hotel billiard room to formulate a plan and establish an organisation to foster and preserve Ireland's unique games and athletic pastimes. Arising out of the meeting, the Gaelic Athletic Association (GAA) was founded. The architects and founding members were Michael Cusack of County Clare, Maurice Davin, Joseph K. Bracken, Thomas St George McCarthy, a District Inspector in the Royal Irish Constabulary, P. J. Ryan of Tipperary, John Wyse Power and John McKay. Maurice Davin was elected president, Cusack, Wyse-Power and McKay were elected Secretaries and it was agreed that Archbishop Croke, Charles Stewart Parnell and Michael Davitt would be asked to become Patrons.

In 1922 it turned over the job of promoting athletics to the National Athletic and Cycling Association.

== Competitions ==
The GAA organises a number of competitions at divisional, county, inter-county, provincial, inter-provincial and national (All-Ireland) levels. A number of competitions follow a progressive format in which, for example, the winners of a club county football competition progress to a competition involving the top clubs from each county in the province, with the champions from each province progressing through a series of national finals.

== Cultural activities ==
The association has had a long history of promoting Irish culture. Through a division of the association known as Scór (Irish for "score"), the association promotes Irish cultural activities, running competitions in music, singing, dancing and storytelling.

Rule 4 of the GAA's official guide states:

The Association shall actively support the Irish language, traditional Irish dancing, music, song, and other aspects of Irish culture. It shall foster an awareness and love of the national ideals in the people of Ireland, and assist in promoting a community spirit through its clubs.

The group was formally founded in 1969 and is promoted through various Association clubs throughout Ireland (as well as some clubs outside Ireland).

== Grounds ==
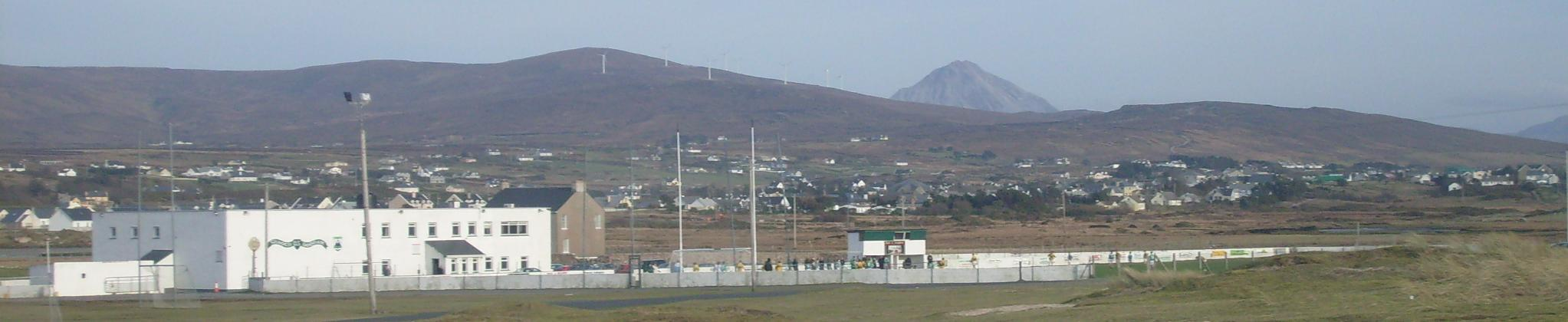
Áras Mhic Eiteagáin clubhouse in Gweedore, County Donegal. These grounds resemble the typical clubhouses to be found in rural areas all over Ireland.

The association has many stadiums scattered throughout Ireland and beyond. Every county and nearly all clubs have grounds, with varying capacities and utilities, where they play their home games.

The hierarchical structure of the GAA is applied to the use of grounds. Clubs play at their own grounds for the early rounds of the club championship, while the latter rounds from quarter-finals to finals are usually held at a county ground, i.e. the ground where inter-county games take place or where the county board is based.

The provincial championship finals are usually played at the same venue every year. However, there have been exceptions, such as in Ulster, where in 2004 and 2005 the Ulster Football Finals were played in Croke Park, as the anticipated attendance was likely to far exceed the capacity of the traditional venue of St Tiernach's Park, Clones.

=== Croke Park ===
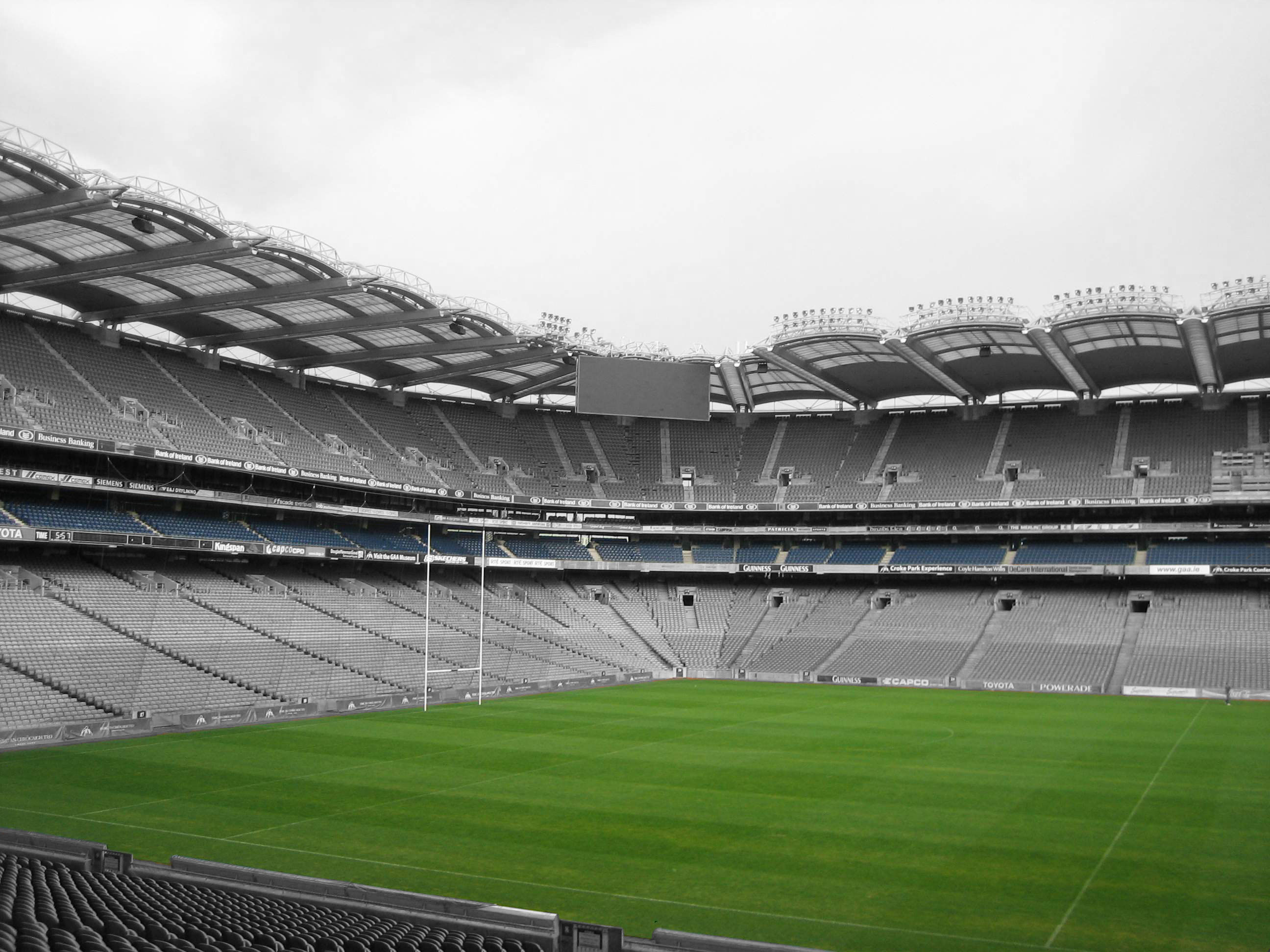
Croke Park sports stadium in Dublin, Ireland. The pitch is used for Gaelic football, hurling and camogie, and has also been used in the past for association football and rugby. It has a capacity of 82,300 people, making it the third largest stadium in Europe.

Croke Park is the association's flagship venue and is known colloquially as Croker or Headquarters, since the venue doubles as the association's base. With a capacity of 82,300, it ranks among the top five stadiums in Europe by capacity, having undergone extensive renovations for most of the 1990s and early 21st century. Every September, Croke Park hosts the All-Ireland inter-county Hurling and Football Finals as the conclusion to the summer championships. Croke Park holds the All-Ireland club football and hurling finals. Croke Park is named after Archbishop Thomas Croke, who was elected as a patron of the GAA during the formation of the GAA in 1884.

The Croke Park campus is also home to the National Handball Centre, which replaced the old Croke Park Handball Centre built in the 1970s. The centre is due to be the home of GAA Handball and to play host to All-Ireland Gaelic Handball finals.

=== Other grounds ===
The next three biggest grounds are all in Munster: Semple Stadium in Thurles, County Tipperary, with a capacity of 53,000, the Gaelic Grounds in Limerick, which holds 50,000, and Páirc Uí Chaoimh, County Cork, which can accommodate 45,000.

Other grounds with capacities above 25,000 include:

- Fitzgerald Stadium, in Killarney, a capacity of 43,180
- MacHale Park in Castlebar, the largest stadium in Connacht (and in the northern half of the country), a capacity of 42,000
- St Tiernach's Park in Clones, County Monaghan, hosts most Ulster finals, a capacity of 36,000
- Kingspan Breffni Park, in Cavan Town, County Cavan, which hosted International rules football series games in 2013, a capacity of 32,000
- Casement Park, in Belfast, which had a capacity of approximately 31,500 prior to its closure in 2013
- Nowlan Park, in Kilkenny, a capacity of 27,800
- O'Moore Park, in Portlaoise, County Laois, a capacity of 27,000
- Healy Park, in Omagh, County Tyrone, a capacity of 26,500
- Pearse Stadium in Galway, which has hosted International rules football series games, a capacity of 26,197

Research by former Fermanagh county footballer Niall Cunningham led to the publication in 2016 by his website, gaapitchlocator.net, of a map of 1,748 GAA grounds in Ireland, ranging from 24 grounds in his own county to 171 in Cork.

== Nationalism and community relations ==
The association has, since its inception, been closely associated with Irish nationalism, and this has continued to the present, particularly in relation to Northern Ireland, where the sports are played predominantly by members of the mainly Catholic nationalist community, and many in the Protestant unionist population consider themselves excluded by a perceived political ethos. According to one sports historian, the GAA "is arguably the most striking example of politics shaping sport in modern history".

A perception within Northern Ireland unionist circles that the GAA is a nationalist organisation is reinforced by the naming of some GAA grounds, clubs, competitions and trophies after prominent nationalists or republicans.

Other critics point to protectionist rules such as Rule 42 which prohibits competing, chiefly British, sports (referred to by some as "garrison games" or foreign sports) from GAA grounds. As a result, the GAA became a target for loyalist paramilitaries during the Troubles when a number of GAA supporters were killed and clubhouses damaged. As the profile of Gaelic football has been raised in Ulster so too has there been an increase in the number of sectarian attacks on Gaelic clubs in Northern Ireland.

Some of the protectionist rules are as follows:

=== Rule 42 and other sports in GAA grounds ===
Rule 42 (Rule 5.1 in the 2009 rulebook) prohibits the use of GAA property for games with interests in conflict with the interests of the GAA referred to by some as "garrison games" or foreign sports. Current rules state that GAA property may only be used for the purpose or in connection with the playing of games controlled by the association. Sports not considered 'in conflict' with the GAA have been permitted.

On 16 April 2005 the GAA's congress voted to temporarily relax Rule 42 and allow international soccer and rugby to be played in the stadium while Lansdowne Road Football Ground was closed for redevelopment. The first soccer and rugby union games permitted in Croke Park took place in early 2007, the first such fixture being Ireland's home match in the Six Nations Rugby Union Championship against France.

In addition to the opening of Croke Park to competing sports, local GAA units have sought to rent their facilities out to other sports organisations for financial reasons in violation of Rule 42. The continued existence of Rule 42 has proven to be controversial since the management of Croke Park has been allowed to earn revenue by renting the facility out to competing sports organisations, but local GAA units which own smaller facilities cannot. It is also said that it is questionable as to whether or not such rental deals would be damaging to the GAA's interests.

=== Defunct rules ===
The GAA has had some notable rules in the past which have since been abolished. Rule 21, instituted in 1897 when it was suspected that Royal Irish Constabulary spies were trying to infiltrate the organization, prohibited members of the British forces from membership of the GAA. The rule was abolished after an overwhelming majority voted for its removal at a special congress convened in November 2001. Rule 27, sometimes referred to as The Ban, dated from 1901 and banned GAA members from taking part in or watching non Gaelic games. During that time people such as Douglas Hyde, GAA patron and then President of Ireland, was expelled for attending a soccer international. Rule 27 was abolished in 1971.

=== Cross-community outreach in Northern Ireland ===
The association points out the role of members of minority religions in the membership throughout its history. For example, the Protestant Jack Boothman was president of the organisation from 1993 to 1997, while Sam Maguire was a Church of Ireland member. Nonetheless, to address concerns of unionists, the association's Ulster Council has embarked on a number of initiatives aimed at making the association and Gaelic games more accessible to northern Protestants. In November 2008, the council launched a Community Development Unit, which is responsible for "Diversity and Community Outreach initiatives". The Cúchulainn Initiative is a cross-community program aimed at establishing teams consisting of Catholic and Protestant schoolchildren with no prior playing experience. Cross-community teams such as the Belfast Cuchulainn under-16 hurling team have been established and gone on to compete at the Continental Youth Championship in the USA. Similar hurling and Gaelic football teams have since emerged in Armagh, Fermanagh, Limavady.

The 'Game of three-halves' cross-community coaching initiative was established in predominantly Protestant east Belfast in 2006. Organised through Knock Presbyterian Church, this scheme brings Association coaches to work alongside their soccer and rugby counterparts to involve primary school children at summer coaching camps. The Ulster Council is also establishing cross-community football and hurling teams in schools and is developing links with the Ulster-Scots Agency and the Church of Ireland. The council has also undertaken a series of meetings with political parties and community groups who would have traditionally have had no involvement in the association.

=== Other community outreach ===
In January 2011, the then President of Ireland, Mary McAleese, announced the launch of an island-wide project called the "GAA Social Initiative". This aims to address the problem of isolation in rural areas where older people have limited engagement with the community. The initiative was later expanded by teaming up with the Irish Farmers Association to integrate that organisation's volunteers into the initiative.

== Participation outside Ireland ==
=== Clubs outside Ireland ===
Members of the Irish diaspora have set-up clubs in a number of regions and countries outside of Ireland, and there are GAA clubs in the United States, Australia, Britain, Canada, China, continental Europe and elsewhere.

The GAA World Games were first played in Abu Dhabi in 2015. The next edition was played in Dublin in 2016 with subsequent editions to be played in Ireland every three years. The 2019 games were awarded to Waterford, but the next edition in Derry was deferred to 2023 due to the COVID pandemic.

=== Internationals ===
While some units of the association outside Ireland participate in Irish competitions, the association itself does not organise regular international games played according to the rules of either Gaelic football or hurling. However, the first international match between France and Italy was played in 2014.

Compromise rules have been reached with two "related sports".

Hurlers play an annual fixture against a national shinty team from Scotland.

International Rules Football matches have taken place between an Irish national team drawn from the ranks of Gaelic footballers, against an Australian national team drawn from the Australian Football League. The venue alternates between Ireland and Australia. In December 2006, the International series between Australia and Ireland was called off due to excessive violence in the matches, but resumed in October 2008 when Ireland won a two test series in Australia. The Irish welcomed the All Australian team at the headquarters of the GAA (Croke Park) on 21 November 2015. It was single one-off test match, which led the Irish to reclaim the Cormac McAnallen Cup by a score of 56–52.

=== Handball ===
The international dimension of Gaelic handball includes a World Championship tournament, alongside a European Tour and US Semi-Professional Tour. The 4-Wall and 1-Wall codes of the game are played around the world [with slightly different rules depending on which country one is playing in] and the World Handball Championships are organised by the World Handball Council. A European Tour has been set up with players from across Europe participating. 4-Wall Handball is played primarily in Ireland, the US and Canada while the 1-Wall code is played (in addition to the three mentioned) in Belgium, France, Holland, Italy, Spain and the UK.

== Winter training ban ==
To address concerns about player burnout, the association adopted a rule in 2007 that prohibited collective training for inter-county players for a period of two months every winter. This has proven to be controversial in that it is difficult to enforce; in the drive to stay competitive, managers have found ways to avoid it, such as organising informal 'athletic clubs' and other activities that they can use to work on the physical fitness of players without overtly appearing to be training specifically at Gaelic games.

== See also ==
- GAA Confidential
- GAA GPA All Stars Awards
- GAA rounders
- Micheál Ó Muircheartaigh
- Micheál Ó Hehir
- Féile na nGael
- Sport in Ireland
- List of All-Ireland Senior Football Championship finals
- List of All-Ireland Senior Hurling Championship finals

Television

- The Sunday Game
- Up for the Match
- Top 20 GAA Moments
