= Club (organization) =

Association of people united by a common interest or goal

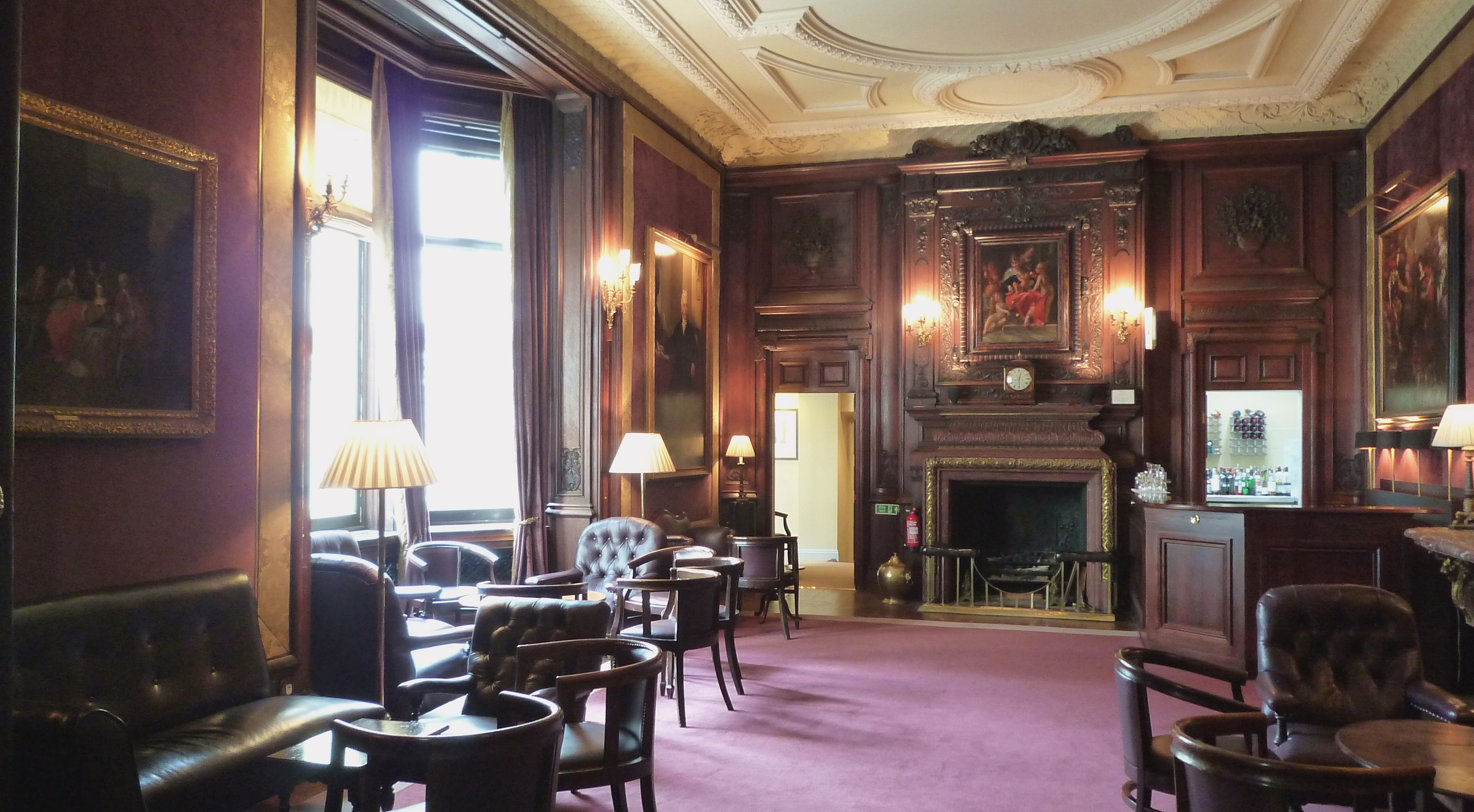
The bar at the Savile Club in London

A club is an association of people united by a common interest or goal. A service club, for example, exists for voluntary or charitable activities. There are clubs devoted to hobbies and sports, social activities clubs, political and religious clubs, and so forth.

== History ==
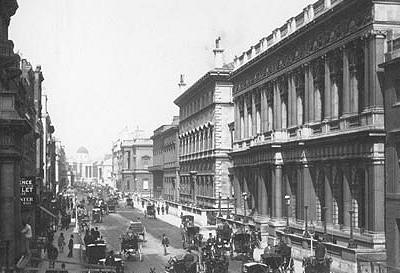
Historical image of Pall Mall with the Carlton Club, describing itself as the "oldest, and most important of all Conservative clubs"

Historically, clubs occurred in all ancient states of which exists detailed knowledge. Once people started living together in larger groups, there was need for people with a common interest to be able to associate despite having no ties of kinship. Organizations of the sort have existed for many years, as evidenced by Ancient Greek clubs and associations (collegia) in Ancient Rome.

=== Origins of the word and concept ===
It is uncertain whether the use of the word "club" originated in its meaning of a knot of people, or from the fact that the members "clubbed" together to pay the expenses of their gatherings. The oldest English clubs were merely informal periodic gatherings of friends for the purpose of dining or drinking with one another. Thomas Occleve (in the time of Henry IV) mentions such a club called La Court de Bonne Compagnie (the Court of Good Company), of which he was a member. In 1659 John Aubrey wrote, "We now use the word clubbe for a sodality [a society, association, or fraternity of any kind] in a tavern."

=== In Shakespeare's day ===
Of early clubs the most famous, latterly, was the Bread Street or Friday Street Club that met at the Mermaid Tavern on the first Friday of each month. John Selden, John Donne, John Fletcher and Francis Beaumont were among the members (although it is often asserted that William Shakespeare and Sir Walter Raleigh were members of this club, there is no documented evidence to support this claim). Another such club, founded by Ben Jonson, met at the Devil Tavern near Temple Bar, also in London.

=== Coffee houses ===
Coffeehouse in London, 17th century

The word “club,” in the sense of an association to promote good-fellowship and social intercourse, became common in England at the time of Tatler and The Spectator (1709–1712). With the introduction of coffee-drinking in the middle of the 17th century, clubs entered on a more permanent phase. The coffee houses of the later Stuart period are the real originals of the modern clubhouse. The clubs of the late 17th and early 18th century type resembled their Tudor forerunners in being oftenest associations solely for conviviality or literary coteries. But many were confessedly political, e.g. The Rota, or Coffee Club (1659), a debating society for the spread of republican ideas, broken up at the Restoration in 1660, the Calves Head Club (c.1693) and the Green Ribbon Club (1675). The characteristics of all these clubs were:

1. No permanent financial bond between the members, each man's liability ending for the time being when he had paid his “score” after the meal.
2. No permanent clubhouse, though each clique tended to make some particular coffee house or tavern their headquarters.

These coffee-house clubs soon became hotbeds of political scandal-mongering and intriguing, and in 1675 King Charles II issued a proclamation which ran: “His Majesty hath thought fit and necessary that coffee houses be (for the future) put down and suppressed,” because “in such houses divers false, malicious and scandalous reports are devised and spread abroad to the Defamation of his Majesty’s Government and to the Disturbance of Peace and Quiet of the Realm.” So unpopular was this proclamation that it was almost instantly found necessary to withdraw it, and by Anne’s reign the coffee-house club was a feature of England’s social life. See English coffeehouses in the 17th and 18th centuries.

=== 18th and 19th century ===
The idea of the club developed in two directions. One was of a permanent institution with a fixed clubhouse. The London coffeehouse clubs in increasing their members absorbed the whole accommodation of the coffeehouse or tavern where they held their meetings, and this became the clubhouse, often retaining the name of the original innkeeper, e.g. White's, Brooks's, Arthur's, and Boodle's. These still exist today as the famous gentlemen's clubs.

The peripatetic lifestyle of the 18th and 19th century middle classes also drove the development of more residential clubs, which had bedrooms and other facilities. Military and naval officers, lawyers, judges, members of Parliament and government officials tended to have an irregular presence in the major cities of the Empire, particularly London, spending perhaps a few months there before moving on for a prolonged period and then returning. Especially when this presence did not coincide with the Season, a permanent establishment in the city (i.e., a house owned or rented, with the requisite staff), or the opening of a townhouse (generally shuttered outside the Season) was inconvenient or uneconomic, while hotels were rare and socially déclassé. Clubbing with a number of like-minded friends to secure a large shared house with a manager was therefore a convenient solution.

The other sort of club meets occasionally or periodically and often has no clubhouse, but exists primarily for some specific object. Such are the many purely athletic, sports and pastimes clubs, the Alpine, chess, yacht and motor clubs. Also there are literary clubs (see writing circle and book club), musical and art clubs, publishing clubs. The name of “club” has been annexed by a large group of associations which fall between the club proper and friendly societies, of a purely periodic and temporary nature, such as slate, goose and Christmas clubs, which do not need to be registered under the Friendly Societies Act.

=== Worldwide ===
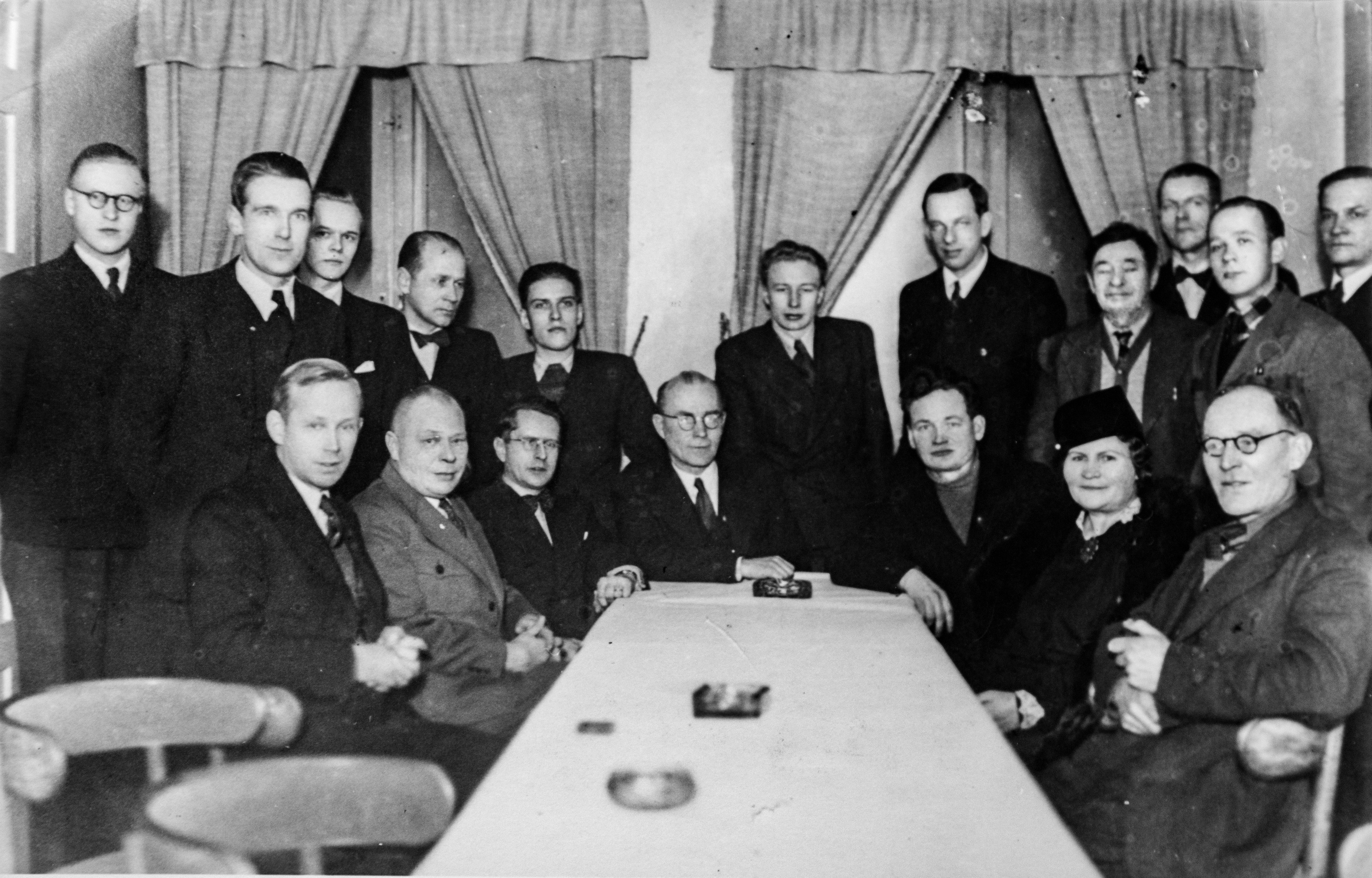
Meeting of the Saimaan Kameraseura photoclub on January 28, 1946 in Lappeenranta, Finland

The institution of the gentleman's club has spread all over the English-speaking world. Many of those who energised the Scottish Enlightenment were members of the Poker Club in Edinburgh. In the United States clubs were first established after the War of Independence. One of the first was the Hoboken Turtle Club (1797), which still survived as of 1911. In former British Empire colonies like India and Pakistan they are known as Gymkhana.

The earliest clubs on the European continent were of a political nature. These in 1848 were repressed in Austria and Germany, and later clubs of Berlin and Vienna were mere replicas of their English prototypes. In France, where the term cercle is most usual, the Club de l'Entresol (1724-1731) was followed by the Club Politique (1782), and during the French Revolution such associations proved important political forces (see Jacobins, Feuillants, Cordeliers). Of the purely social clubs in Paris the most notable were the Jockey-Club de Paris (1833), the Cercle de l'Union, the Traveller's and the Cercle Interallié.

== Types of clubs ==
=== Buying club ===
Buyer's clubs or buying clubs are clubs organized to pool members' collective buying power, enabling them to make purchases at lower prices per individual item than are generally available, or purchase goods that might otherwise be difficult to obtain. There are many legitimate buying clubs – for example, food buying clubs – but many are unauthorized credit card billing scams, in which a customer is induced to enroll in a free trial of a buyer's club membership, and then unexpectedly billed when the trial ends.

=== Country or sports club ===
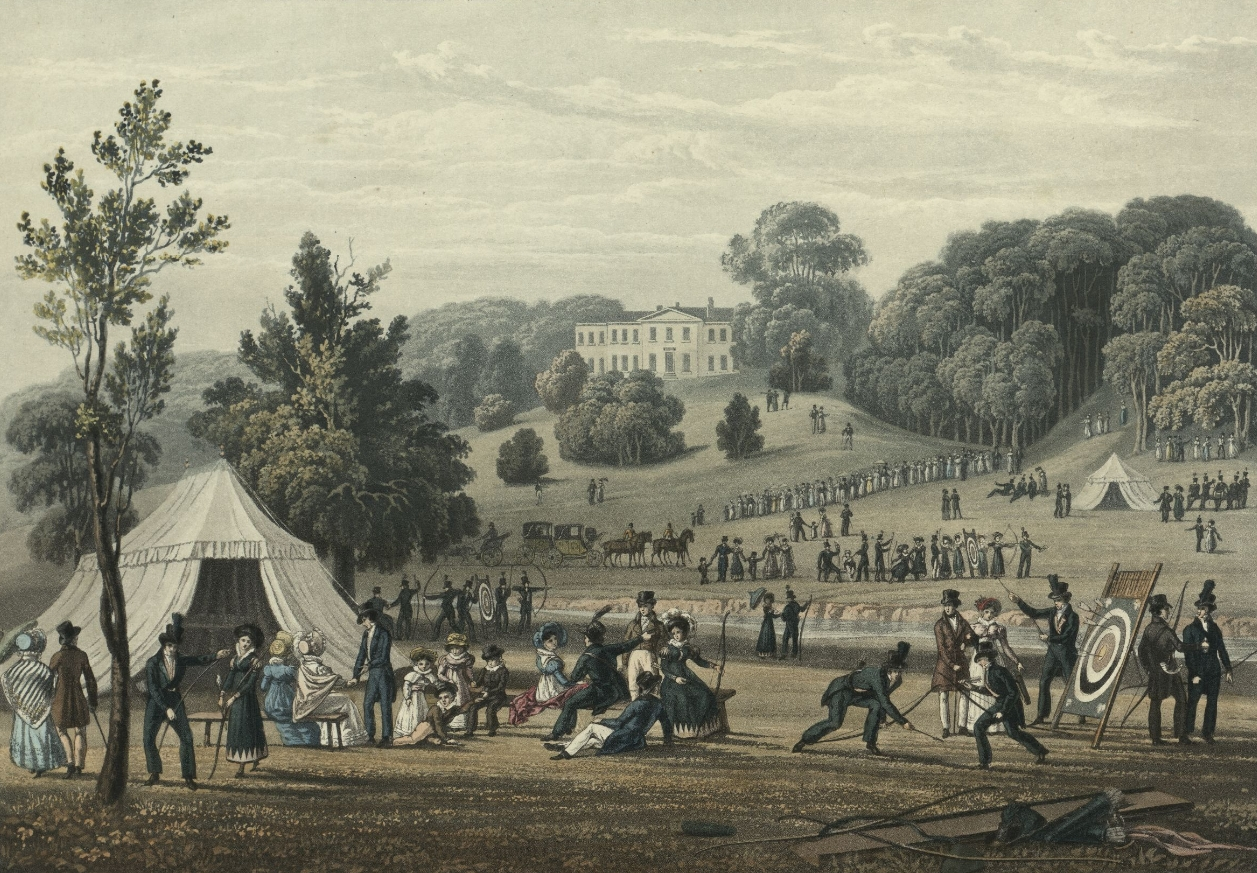
A print of the 1822 meeting of the "Royal British Bowmen" archery club

There are two types of athletic and sports clubs: those organized for sporting participants (which include athletic clubs and country clubs), and those primarily for spectator fans of a team.

Athletic and country clubs offer one or more recreational sports facilities to their members. Such clubs may also offer social activities and facilities, and some members may join primarily to take advantage of the social opportunities. Country clubs offer a variety of recreational sports facilities to their members and are usually located in suburban or rural areas. Most country clubs have golf facilities. Swimming pools, tennis courts, polo grounds and exercise facilities are also common. Country clubs usually provide dining facilities to their members and guests, and frequently host special events like weddings. Similar clubs in urban areas are often called "athletic clubs". These clubs often feature indoor sports, such as indoor tennis, squash, futsal, basketball, volleyball, boxing, and exercise facilities.

Members of sports clubs that support a team can be sports amateurs—groups who meet to practice a sport, as for example in most cycling clubs—or professionals; football clubs consist of well-paid team members and thousands of supporters. A sports club can thus comprise participants (not necessarily competitors) or spectator fans, or both.

Some organizations exist with a mismatch between name and function. The Jockey Club is not a club for jockeys, but rather exists to regulate the sport of horseracing; the Marylebone Cricket Club was until recently the regulatory body of cricket; and so on. Sports club should not be confused with gyms and health clubs, which also can be for members only.

=== Fraternities and sororities ===
Fraternities and sororities are social clubs of secondary or higher education students. Membership in these organizations is generally by invitation only.

=== Hobby club ===
Hobbies are practiced for interest and enjoyment, rather than financial reward. Examples include science fiction clubs, ham radio, model railroading, collecting, creative and artistic pursuits, making, tinkering, sports, and adult education. Participants may form an organization to coordinate gatherings of hobbyists, provide services related to the activity (for example, a club of board game enthusiasts might have a library of games for members), or act as a buyers' club.

=== Professional societies ===
These organizations are partly social, partly professional in nature and provide professionals with opportunities for advanced education, presentations on current research, business contacts, public advocacy for the profession and other advantages. Examples of these groups include medical associations, scientific societies, autograph club and bar associations. Professional societies frequently have layers of organization, with regional, national and international levels. The local chapters generally meet more often and often include advanced students unable to attend national meetings.

=== School club ===
These are activities performed by students that fall outside the realm of classes. Such clubs may fall outside the normal curriculum of school or university education or, as in the case of subject matter clubs (e.g. student chapters of professional societies), may supplement the curriculum through informal meetings and professional mentoring.

=== Secret club ===
A secret society is a club or an organization whose activities, events, inner functioning, or membership are concealed. The society may or may not attempt to conceal its existence. The term usually excludes covert groups, such as intelligence agencies or guerrilla warfare insurgencies, that hide their activities and memberships but maintain a public presence.

=== Service club ===
A service club is a type of voluntary organization where members meet regularly for social outings and to perform charitable works either by direct hands-on efforts or by raising money for other organizations.

=== Social activities club ===
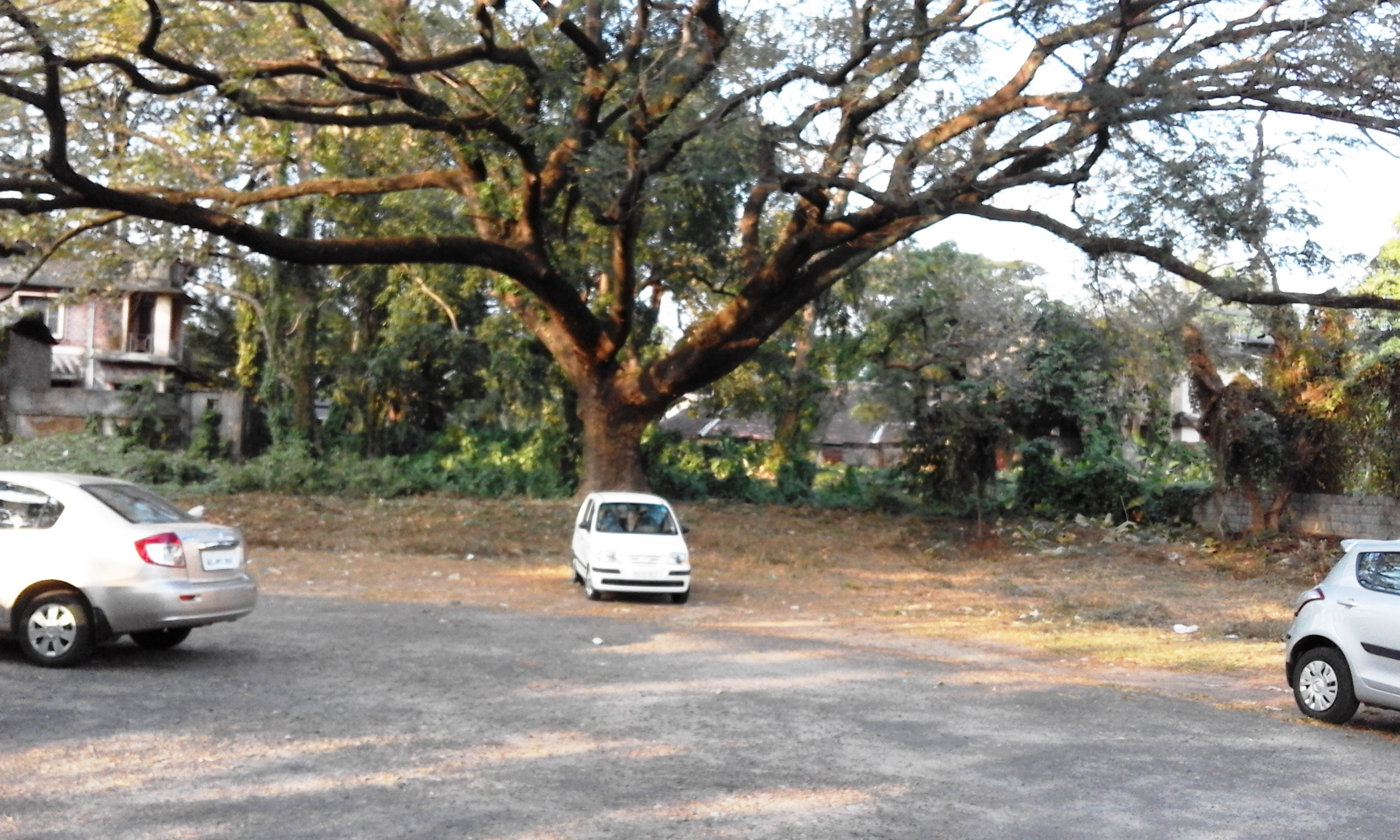
Officers Club, Palakkad, India

Social activities clubs are a modern combination of several other types of clubs and reflect today's more eclectic and varied society. These clubs are centered around the activities available to the club members in the city or area in which the club is located. Because the purpose of these clubs is split between general social interaction and taking part in the events themselves, clubs tend to have more single members than married ones; some clubs restrict their membership to one of the other, and some are for gay and lesbian patrons.

Membership can be limited or open to the general public, as can the events. Most clubs have a limited membership based upon specific criteria, and limit the events to members to increase the security of the members, thus creating an increased sense of camaraderie and belonging. Social activities clubs can be for profit or not for profit, and some are a mix of the two (a for-profit club with a non-profit charitable arm, for instance).

=== Social club ===
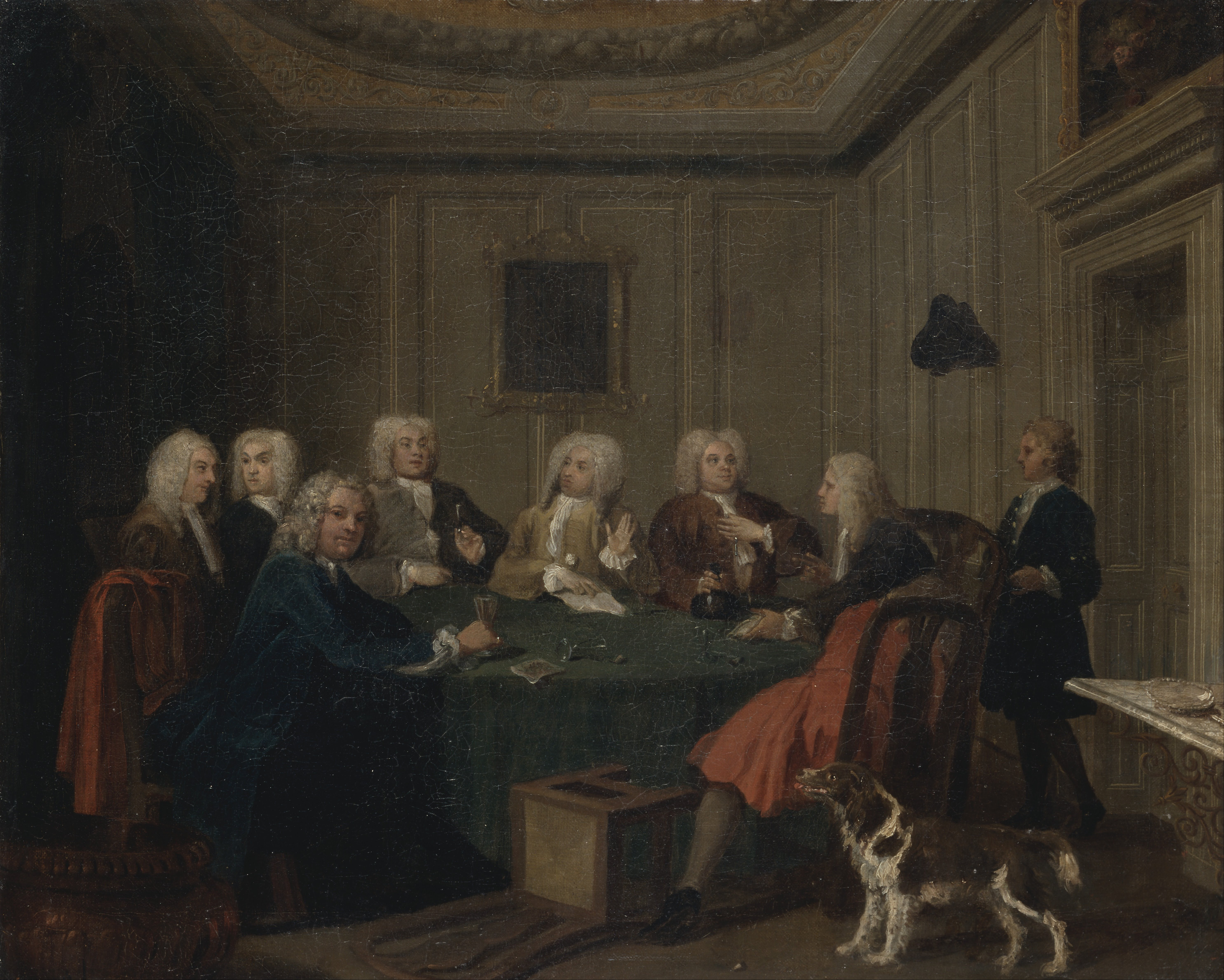
A Club of Gentlemen by Joseph Highmore c. 1730

Some social clubs are organized around competitive games, such as chess or bridge. Other clubs are designed to encourage membership of certain social classes. In the 1940s, 1950s and 1960s social clubs were the precursor name of gangs like the infamous Hamburgs of Chicago. Latino immigrant adult and youth groups organized themselves as social clubs like: Black Eagles, Flaming Arrows, Paragons and Young Lords. Those made up of the elite are best known as gentlemen's clubs (not to be confused with strip clubs) and country clubs (though these also have an athletic function, see above). Membership to gentlemen's clubs require the ability to pay large fees as well as an invitation by existing members who seek new recruits who meet personal criteria such as lifestyle, moral base, etc. Less elitist, but still in some cases exclusive, are working men's clubs. Clubs restricted to either officers or enlisted men exist on military bases.

The modern Gentlemen's club is occasionally proprietary, i.e. owned by an individual or private syndicate and run on a for-profit basis, but more frequently owned by the members who delegate to a committee the management of its affairs, first reached its highest development in London, where the district of St. James's has long been known as "Clubland".

Current London proprietary clubs include Soho House, which commenced business in 1995, and Soho's Groucho Club, which opened in 1985 as "the antidote to the traditional club." In this spirit, the club was named for Groucho Marx because of his famous remark that he would not wish to join any club that would have him as a member.

=== Political club ===
A political club is a group of people who share a political ideology, or supporters of a particular political party, of which it may function as a local element. For example, a Constituency Labour Party is an association of British Labour Party members who live in a given electoral district; the rival Conservatives instead have groups called Conservative Associations. Most Canadian political parties are likewise organized into riding associations.

== See also ==
- Anti-Flirt Club
- Autograph club
- Burschenschaft
- Childhood secret club
- Club good (eg economics)
- Confidentiality club
- Content club
- Fan club
- FILMCLUB (eg after school film clubs)
- Garden club
- Gentlemen's club (social club)
- Health club
- Night club
- Private members' club
- Probus Clubs (for retired or semi-retired business people)
- Social club
- Sports club
- Strip club
- Student club
- Users' group, (focused on a particular technology, eg computers)
- Youth club
