= Paye ta shnek =

Website

Paye ta shnek (paye ta chatte in Alsacian argot) was a web site created in 2012 by Anaïs Bourdet that collected accounts of street harassment from women.

== Book ==
In 2013, the website published a book containing a selection of the testimonies. The book was published following a crowd fundraising effort and published by Fayard.

In June 2019, Bourdet announced that the site would stop being updated.

== Bibliography ==
- Paye ta shnek : tentatives de séduction en milieu urbain. Anaïs. Bourdet. [Paris]. 2014. ISBN 978-2-86374-354-6. OCLC 995613497.
