= Anaïs Bourdet =

French feminist activist

- Born: November 21, 1984 (age 41)
- Occupations: activist and graphic designer
- Known for: creation of Paye ta shnek

Anaïs Bourdet (born 21 November 1984) is a French feminist activist, against street harassment and the rape culture.

In 2012, she created the Tumblr Paye ta shnek. From 2012 to 2019, the blog collected more than 15,000 testimonials, from female victims of street harassment. Her initiative predated the #MeToo movement.

== Life ==
Anaïs Bourdet grew up in Lambesc, in the Bouches-du-Rhône. She graduated from the ECV Aix-en-Provence in 2010, and moved to Marseille. From 2013 to 2016, she lived in Argentina, before returning to settle in Marseille. She is a freelance graphic designer, graphic design teacher, and was part of the 5M4 collective.

In February 2016, she protested against the abolition of anti-harassment and gender-based violence measures in the Senate in the transport safety bill. After an op-ed written with the collective Féministes par Inadvertance published in L'Express, a petition which collected more than 65,000 signatures. She contributed to a poster campaign. A commission reintroduced the article 22 of the law, which finally passed.

In 2017, she testified at the National Assembly on the importance of an intersectional approach to analyzing sexist attacks, after noting among the testimonies received by Paye ta Shnek those concerning attacks that were not only sexist but also homophobic, racist or against women with disabilities.

She contributed to La guide de voyage: Paris, by Charlotte Soulary, published in January 2018.

In November 2016, she participated in the TEDx ParcMontsouris with a conference called "I'm tired of being a woman: street harassment". She contributed to Womanhood, a web-documentary directed by Florie Bavard, which gives voice to Egyptian women in the form of a series of fifteen portraits.

In 2017, she appeared at a conference at Centre Pompidou.

In January 2018, she launched the Mauvaise Compagnie online store on Etsy, which sells posters, T-shirts, and bags illustrated by her visuals. A portionof the profits are donated to feminist associations: the Féministes contre le Cyber-harassment collective, Family Planning, Stop Street Harassment, Versatility, Lallab, SOS Méditerranée and Kâlî21. The entire collection is handmade in France in Marseille and is certified vegan.

Since October 2018, she has been hosting the YESSS podcast, produced by the PopKast label, with Elsa Miské and Margaïd Quioc.

In 2019, she founded the sissislafamille tumbler, for solidarity among women.

== Paye ta shnek ==
In 2012, Anaïs Bourdet discovered the short documentary film by Sophie Peeters, on the harassment which she endured. She then decided to create a Tumblr gathering the testimonies of women. The account quickly receives more than a hundred testimonials a day, which she put together and then published anonymously online.

The Paye ta shnek initiative subsequently inspired other versions denouncing sexism on several subjects: Paye ton uterus, on the problems of access to care for women launched in 2015, the blog Paye ta robe which denounces sexism in the professional environment of lawyers, Paye ta blouse which compiled testimonials from the medical community in January 2017, Paye ta fac, launched by students from the University of Avignon to denounce sexism in the university environment, Paye ton taf sur le sexisme and sexual harassment at work, Paye ton journal, to denounce the sexism of which women are victims in newsrooms or in journalism schools, or Paye ton gynecologist launched to denounce obstetrical and gynecological violence.

On 22 June 2019, she was attacked leaving a Marseille club with friends. She announced in a message published on social networks, the stopping of the Tumblr Paye ta shnek. Paye Ta Shnek's pages on social networks had 226,000 subscribers on Facebook and 29,000 on Twitter. The designer explained that she has decided to stop collecting and publishing testimonies from women victims of street harassment, and testifies to her emotional fatigue following cyberharassment.

In 2014, she edited and published, after a crowdfunding campaign, the book Paye ta shnek: Attempts at seduction in the urban environment.
