= Flirting =

Social behavior that suggests interest in a deeper relationship with the other person

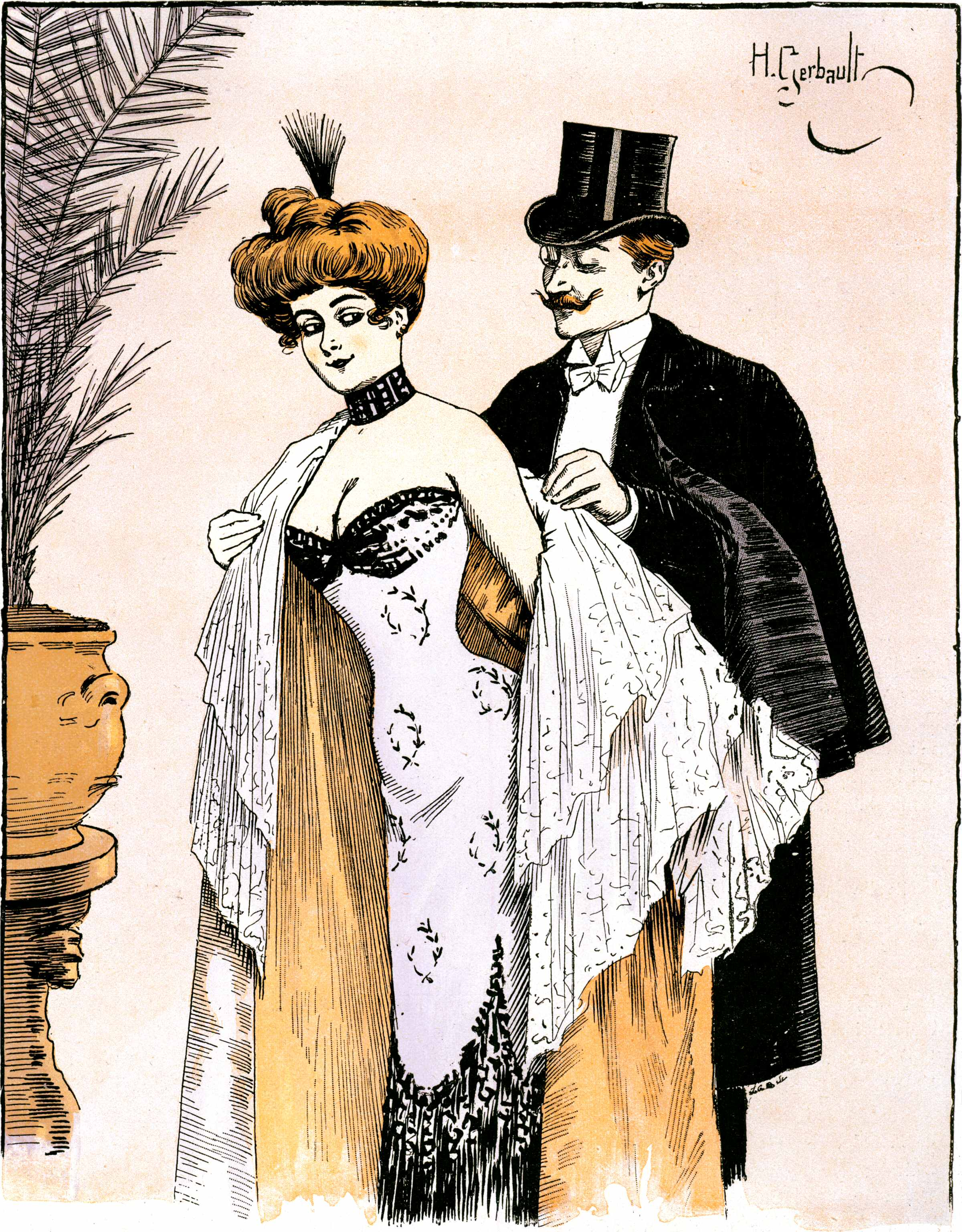
"Would you take offense if I had the gall to plant a kiss on this beautiful shoulder?" "You'll figure that out soon enough after the deed." (poster by Henri Gerbault)

Flirting, formally known as coquetry, is a form of social communication via body language, verbal expressions, or written language, intended to evoke feelings of playful excitement and potential romantic or sexual interest. Flirting can change in intention as well as intensity, whether it is performed for short-term fun or employed with a longer-term intention of seeking a romantic or sexual relationship.

A person might flirt with another by speaking or behaving in such a way that suggests their desire to increase intimacy in their current relationship with that person. The approach may include communicating a sense of playfulness, irony, or by using double entendres. Friendliness is distinct from flirting.

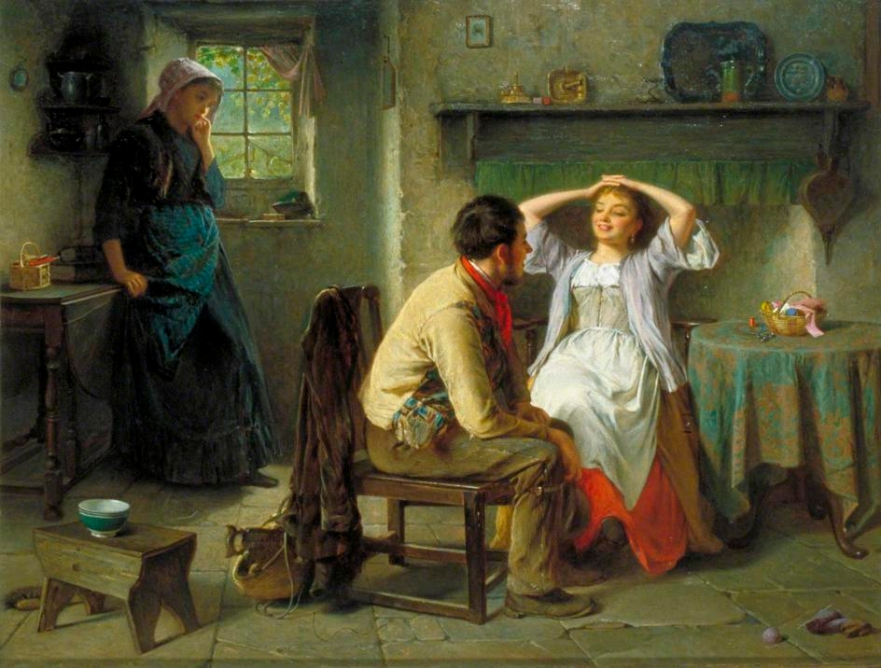
A study in body language: Haynes King's Jealousy and Flirtation

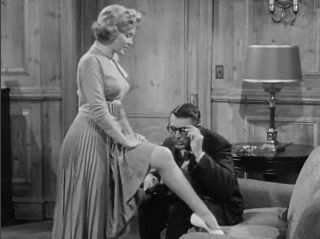
Laurel (played by Marilyn Monroe) flirting with Dr. Fulton (played by Cary Grant) in the film Monkey Business (1952)

== Etymology ==
The origin of the word "flirt" is unknown. The first use of the word dates to 1580—with the intransitive "flit" and the noun form—ca 1590—with the transitive "flick".

Flirt has been attributed to the French conter fleurette, meaning to woo. Fleurette, meaning small flower, was used in the 16th century in some sonnets and texts, and has since fallen out of use. This expression is still used in French, often mockingly, although the English loanword, "to flirt", is in the common vernacular. Flirting in the English language has the same meaning as to "conter fleurette".

== Historical context ==
During World War II, anthropologist Margaret Mead was working in Britain for the British Ministry of Information and later for the U.S. Office of War Information, delivering speeches and writing articles to help American soldiers better understand British civilians, and vice versa. Mead found a pattern of misunderstandings in the flirtations between American soldiers and British women regarding who was supposed to take which initiative. She wrote of the Americans, "The boy learns to make advances and rely upon the girl to repulse them whenever they are inappropriate to the state of feeling between the pair", as contrasted to the British, where "the girl is reared to depend upon a slight barrier of chilliness... which the boys learn to respect, and for the rest to rely upon the men to approach or advance, as warranted by the situation." When flirting with each other, British women could interpret an American soldier's gregariousness as something more intimate or serious than he had intended.

Communications theorist Paul Watzlawick researched courtship behaviors between English women and North American servicemen in late- to post-WWII, finding common misunderstandings of intent. The simple act of kissing during the 'wrong stage' of the courtship often led both parties to believe the other was being too forward, too soon.

== Purpose ==
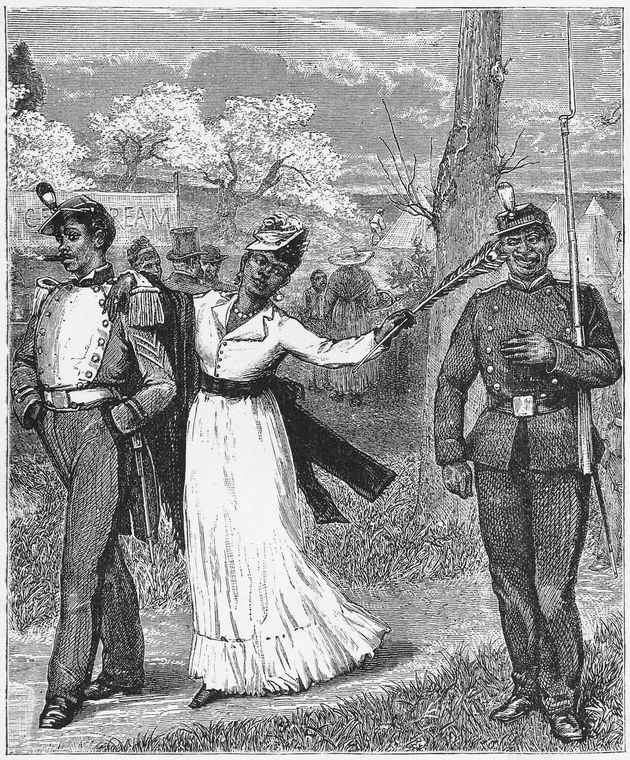
A woman flirts with a soldier by tickling him with a feather.

According to social anthropologist Kate Fox, there are two main types of flirting: flirting for fun, and flirting with further intent. In a 2014 review, sociologist David Henningsen identified six main motivations for flirting: sex, relational development, exploration, fun, self-esteem, and as a means to an end. Henningsen found that many flirting interactions involve more than one of these motives.

Henningsen and Fox showed that flirting can sometimes be used just for fun. People may engage in flirting to consolidate or maintain a romantic relationship with their partner.

== Human mating strategy ==
Many studies have confirmed that sex is a motivation for flirting. A study by Messman and colleagues demonstrated that the more one was physically attracted to a person, the higher the chances one would flirt with them.

Many people flirt as a courtship initiation method. The person flirting will send out signals of sexual availability to another, and expects to see the interest returned in order to continue flirting. Flirting can involve non-verbal signs, such as an exchange of glances, hand-touching, and hair-touching; or verbal signs, such as chatting, giving flattering comments, and exchanging telephone numbers in order to initiate further contact.

== Covert and overt signaling ==
Human flirting can be either covert or overt in contrast to the typically overt courtship display of non human animals. If the main purpose of flirting is to signal interest to another person, then one might expect that the signaling would be done clearly and explicitly. A study on heterosexual dating found that men's responses to being asked out on a date depend strongly on their interest in the initiating woman. An explanation for the in some cases ambiguous nature of human flirting lies in the costs associated with overt courtship. According to Gersick and colleagues, signaling interest can be socially costly, such as risking existing friendship or affect social reputation. The costs associated with interest signaling may be magnified in humans compared to the animal world, as the existence of language means information can circulate much further. For instance, information overheard by an eavesdropper can be spread to large social networks, thereby magnifying the social costs.

Flirting can assess whether another person might be interested in reciprocating while maintaining plausible deniability to reduce social costs. Online flirting can reduce perceived risks.

=== Misinterpretation ===
Flirting is often performed subtly, and evidence shows that people are often mistaken in how they interpret flirting behaviors. A 2015 study found that covert flirting is not detected in the majority of cases. Friendliness and flirting are distinct, though in some cases friendliness has been mistaken for flirting.

Without consent or implied consent by the receiving party, some flirting behavior, such as double entendres, can be viewed as sexual harassment.

== Cultural variations ==
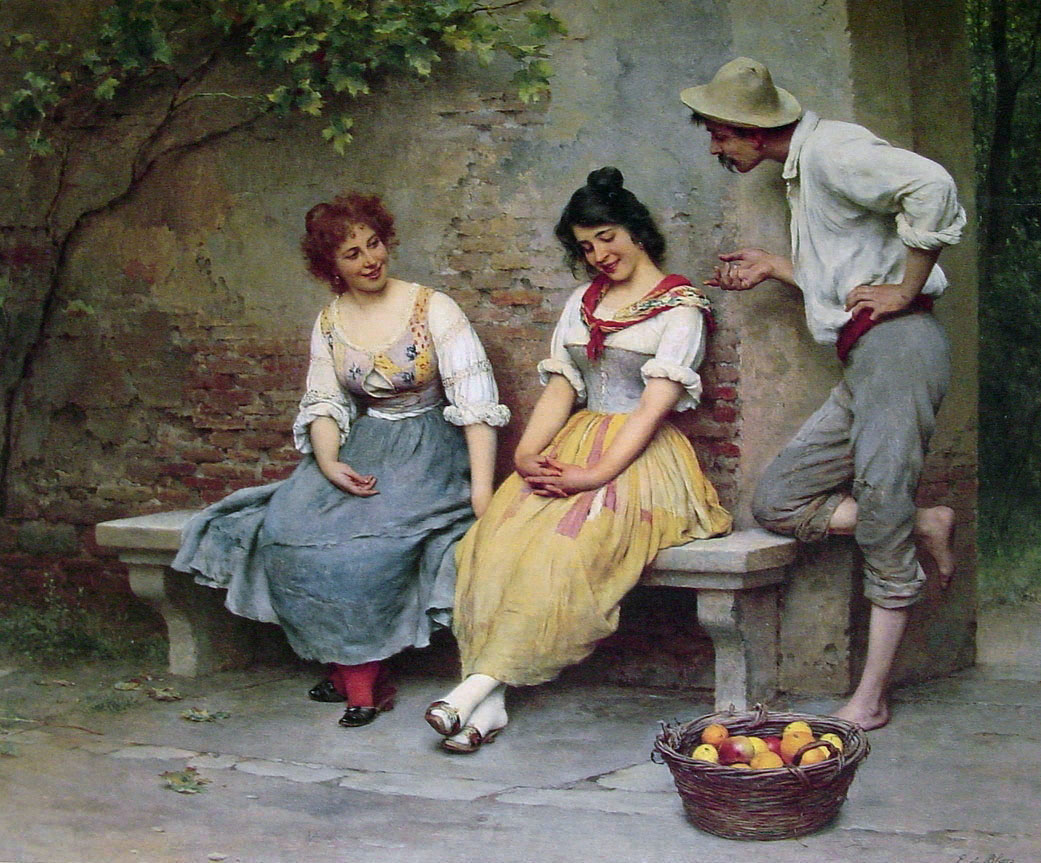
The Flirtation by Eugene de Blaas. A study of body language: a man flirting

Flirting behavior varies between cultures due to different modes of social etiquette, such as how closely people should stand, how long to hold eye contact, how much touching is appropriate and so forth. Nonetheless, some behaviors may be universal. Ethologist Irenäus Eibl-Eibesfeldt discovered that women from different continents (Africa and North America) behave similarly in some ways when flirting, such as nonchalantly breaking their gaze and smiling after first staring for a prolonged period of time. In "contact cultures," such as those in the Mediterranean or Latin America, closer proximity is common, compared with cultures such as those in Britain or Northern Europe. The variation in social norms may lead to different interpretations of what is considered to be flirting.

Japanese courtesans had another form of flirting, emphasizing non-verbal relationships by hiding the lips and showing the eyes, as depicted in much Shunga art, the most popular print media at the time, until the late 19th century. In Japan, flirting in the street or public places is known as nanpa.

The fan was extensively used as a means of communication and therefore a way of flirting from the 16th century onwards in some European societies, especially England and Spain. A whole sign language was developed with the use of the fan, and etiquette books and magazines were published. Charles Francis Badini created the Original Fanology or Ladies' Conversation Fan, which was published by William Cock in London in 1797. The use of the fan was not limited to women, as men also carried fans and learned how to convey messages with them. For instance, placing the fan near the heart meant "I love you", while opening a fan wide meant "Wait for me".

In Spain, ladies used fans to communicate with suitors or prospective suitors without attracting the notice of their families or chaperons. This use was highly popular during the 19th and early 20th centuries.

=== Gendered roles ===
Flirting can have gender roles. Henningsen and colleagues' study observed in 2004 that flirting with sexual intent was found to be more prominent amongst men while flirting for relationship development purposes was more often employed by women. The parental investment theory predicts in case of a risk of pregnancy with gender differences in parental investment, that females would be more selective than males and courtship would be more commonly initiated by males. In case of no risk of pregnancy this gendered effect is predicted to be reduced.

=== Gender egalitarian roles ===
Flirting can follow gender egalitarian norms. Women initiating flirting was found to increase with their sense of personal control. Among the approaches women can use to signal interest in men the most effective were directly asking for a first date or a telephone call according to a 2009 study.

== See also ==
- Anti-Flirt Club
- Implied consent
- Sexual script theory
- Wingman (social)
