= Confidentiality =

Non-disclosure of information

Confidentiality involves a set of rules or a promise sometimes executed through confidentiality agreements or laws that limits the access to or places restrictions on the distribution of certain types of information.

== Legal confidentiality ==
By law, lawyers are often required to keep confidential anything on the representation of a client. The duty of confidentiality is much broader than the attorney–client evidentiary privilege, which only covers communications between the attorney and the client.

Both the privilege and the duty serve the purpose of encouraging clients to speak frankly about their cases. This way, lawyers can carry out their duty to provide clients with zealous representation. Otherwise, the opposing side may be able to surprise the lawyer in court with something he did not know about his client, which may weaken the client's position. Also, a distrustful client might hide a relevant fact he thinks is incriminating, but that a skilled lawyer could turn to the client's advantage (for example, by raising affirmative defenses like self-defense). However, most jurisdictions have exceptions for situations where the lawyer has reason to believe that the client may kill or seriously injure someone, may cause substantial injury to the financial interest or property of another, or is using (or seeking to use) the lawyer's services to perpetrate a crime or fraud. In such situations the lawyer has the discretion, but not the obligation, to disclose information designed to prevent the planned action. Most states have a version of this discretionary disclosure rule under Rules of Professional Conduct, Rule 1.6 (or its equivalent). A few jurisdictions have made this traditionally discretionary duty mandatory. For example, see the New Jersey and Virginia Rules of Professional Conduct, Rule 1.6.

In some jurisdictions, the lawyer must try to convince the client to conform his or her conduct to the boundaries of the law before disclosing any otherwise confidential information. These exceptions generally do not cover crimes that have already occurred, even in extreme cases where murderers have confessed the location of missing bodies to their lawyers but the police are still looking for those bodies. The U.S. Supreme Court and many state supreme courts have affirmed the right of a lawyer to withhold information in such situations. Otherwise, it would be impossible for any criminal defendant to obtain a zealous defense.

California is famous for having one of the strongest duties of confidentiality in the world; its lawyers must protect client confidences at "every peril to himself [or herself]" under former California Business and Professions Code section 6068(e). Until an amendment in 2004 (which turned subsection (e) into subsection (e)(1) and added subsection (e)(2) to section 6068), California lawyers were not even permitted to disclose that a client was about to commit murder or assault. The Supreme Court of California promptly amended the California Rules of Professional Conduct to conform to the new exception in the revised statute. Recent legislation in the UK curtails the confidentiality professionals like lawyers and accountants can maintain at the expense of the state. Accountants, for example, are required to disclose to the state any suspicions of fraudulent accounting and, even, the legitimate use of tax saving schemes if those schemes are not already known to the tax authorities.

=== Breach of confidence in English law ===
The "three traditional requirements of the cause of action for breach of confidence" were identified by Megarry J in Coco v A N Clark (Engineers) Ltd (1968) in the following terms:

In my judgment, three elements are normally required if, apart from contract, a case of breach of confidence is to succeed. First, the information itself, in the words of Lord Greene, M.R. in the Saltman case on page 215, must "have the necessary quality of confidence about it." Secondly, that information must have been imparted in circumstances importing an obligation of confidence. Thirdly, there must be an unauthorised use of that information to the detriment of the party communicating it.

The 1896 case featuring the royal accoucheur Dr William Smoult Playfair showed the difference between lay and medical views. Playfair was consulted by Linda Kitson; he ascertained that she had been pregnant while separated from her husband. He informed his wife, a relative of Kitson's, in order that she protect herself and their daughters from moral contagion. Kitson sued, and the case gained public notoriety, with huge damages awarded against the doctor.

== Medical confidentiality ==
Confidentiality is commonly applied to conversations between doctors and patients. Legal protections prevent physicians from revealing certain discussions with patients, even under oath in court. This physician-patient privilege only applies to secrets shared between physician and patient during the course of providing medical care.

The rule dates back to at least the Hippocratic Oath, which reads in part: Whatever, in connection with my professional service, or not in connection with it, I see or hear, in the life of men, which ought not to be spoken of abroad, I will not divulge, as reckoning that all such should be kept secret.

Traditionally, medical ethics has viewed the duty of confidentiality as a relatively non-negotiable tenet of medical practice.

=== United States ===
Confidentiality is standard in the United States by HIPAA laws, specifically the Privacy Rule, and various state laws, some more rigorous than HIPAA. However, numerous exceptions to the rules have been carved out over the years. For example, many American states require physicians to report gunshot wounds to the police and impaired drivers to the Department of Motor Vehicles. Confidentiality is also challenged in cases involving the diagnosis of a sexually transmitted disease in a patient who refuses to reveal the diagnosis to a spouse, and in the termination of a pregnancy in an underage patient, without the knowledge of the patient's parents. Many states in the U.S. have laws governing parental notification in underage abortion. Confidentiality can be protected in medical research via certificates of confidentiality.

=== European Union ===
Due to the EU Directive 2001/20/EC, inspectors appointed by the Member States have to maintain confidentiality whenever they gain access to confidential information as a result of the good clinical practice inspections in accordance with applicable national and international requirements.

A typical patient declaration might read:

I have been informed of the benefit that I gain from the protection and the rights granted by the European Union Data Protection Directive and other national laws on the protection of my personal data. I agree that the representatives of the sponsor or possibly the health authorities can have access to my medical records. My participation in the study will be treated as confidential. I will not be referred to by my name in any report of the study. My identity will not be disclosed to any person, except for the purposes described above and in the event of a medical emergency or if required by the law. My data will be processed electronically to determine the outcome of this study, and to provide it to the health authorities. My data may be transferred to other countries (such as the USA). For these purposes the sponsor has to protect my personal information even in countries whose data privacy laws are less strict than those of this country.

=== HIV confidentiality ===
In the United Kingdom information about an individual's HIV status is kept confidential within the National Health Service. This is based in law, in the NHS Constitution, and in key NHS rules and procedures. It is also outlined in every NHS employee's contract of employment and in professional standards set by regulatory bodies. The National AIDS Trust's Confidentiality in the NHS: Your Information, Your Rights outlines these rights. All registered healthcare professionals must abide by these standards and if they are found to have breached confidentiality, they can face disciplinary action.

A healthcare worker shares confidential information with someone else who is, or is about to, provide the patient directly with healthcare to make sure they get the best possible treatment. They only share information that is relevant to their care in that instance, and with consent.

There are two ways to give consent: explicit consent or implied consent. Explicit consent is when a patient clearly communicates to a healthcare worker, verbally or in writing or in some other way, that relevant confidential information can be shared. Implied consent means that a patient's consent to share personal confidential information is assumed. When personal confidential information is shared between healthcare workers, consent is taken as implied.

If a patient doesn't want a healthcare worker to share confidential health information, they need to make this clear and discuss the matter with healthcare staff. Patients have the right, in most situations, to refuse permission for a health care professional to share their information with another healthcare professional, even one giving them care—but are advised, where appropriate, about the dangers of this course of action, due to possible drug interactions.

However, in a few limited instances, a healthcare worker can share personal information without consent if it is in the public interest. These instances are set out in guidance from the General Medical Council, which is the regulatory body for doctors. Sometimes the healthcare worker has to provide the information – if required by law or in response to a court order.

The National AIDS Trust has written a guide for people living with HIV to confidentiality in the NHS.

== Clinical and counseling psychology ==
The ethical principle of confidentiality requires that information shared by a client with a therapist isn't shared without consent, and that the sharing of information would be guided by ETHIC Model: Examining professional values, after thinking about ethical standards of the certifying association, hypothesize about different courses of action and possible consequences, identifying how it and to whom will it be beneficial per professional standards, and after consulting with supervisor and colleagues. Confidentiality principle bolsters the therapeutic alliance, as it promotes an environment of trust. There are important exceptions to confidentiality, namely where it conflicts with the clinician's duty to warn or duty to protect. This includes instances of suicidal behavior or homicidal plans, child abuse, elder abuse and dependent adult abuse. Information shared by a client with a therapist is considered as privileged communication, however in certain cases and based on certain provinces and states they are negated, it is determined by the use of negative and positive freedom.

== Commercial confidentiality ==
Some legal jurisdictions recognise a category of commercial confidentiality whereby a business may withhold information on the basis of perceived harm to "commercial interests". For example, Coca-Cola's main syrup formula remains a trade secret.

== Banking confidentiality ==
Banking secrecy, alternatively known as financial privacy, banking discretion, or bank safety, is a conditional agreement between a bank and its clients that all foregoing activities remain secure, confidential, and private. Most often associated with banking in Switzerland, banking secrecy is prevalent in Luxembourg, Monaco, Hong Kong, Singapore, Ireland, and Lebanon, among other off-shore banking institutions.

Also known as bank–client confidentiality or banker–client privilege, the practice was started by Italian merchants during the 1600s near Northern Italy (a region that would become the Italian-speaking region of Switzerland).

== Public policy concerns ==
Confidentiality agreements that "seal" litigation settlements are not uncommon, but this can leave regulators and society ignorant of public hazards. In the U.S. state of Washington, for example, journalists discovered that about two dozen medical malpractice cases had been improperly sealed by judges, leading to improperly weak discipline by the state Department of Health. In the 1990s and early 2000s, the Catholic sexual abuse scandal involved a number of confidentiality agreements with victims. Some states have passed laws that limit confidentiality. For example, in 1990 Florida passed a 'Sunshine in Litigation' law that limits confidentiality from concealing public hazards. Washington state, Texas, Arkansas, and Louisiana have laws limiting confidentiality as well, although judicial interpretation has weakened the application of these types of laws. In the U.S. Congress, a similar federal Sunshine in Litigation Act has been proposed but not passed in 2009, 2011, 2014, and 2015.

== See also ==
- Bank secrecy
- Classified information
- Confidentiality club
- Confidentiality, integrity, and availability
- Confidential reporting system
- Data Protection Act 1998
- Fiduciary
- Integrity
- Mature minor doctrine
- Media transparency
- Mental reservation (a form of deception that does not involve outright lying)
- Non-disclosure agreement, also called confidentiality agreement
- Physician–patient privilege for Medical confidentiality
- Privacy law
- Privilege (evidence)
- Protection of sources, also called confidentiality of (journalistic) sources
- Seal of the confessional
- Secrecy
- Trade secret
- Under seal (lat. obsignato)
