= Anti-Flirt Club =

1920s American club

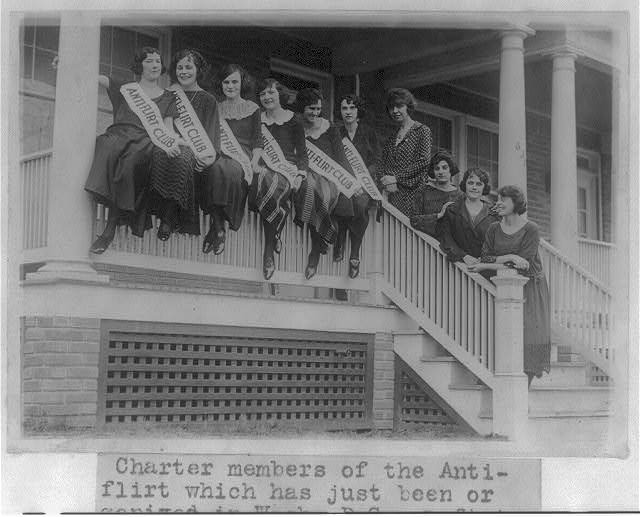
The Anti-Flirt Club. President Alice Reighly is posed at the head of the staircase.

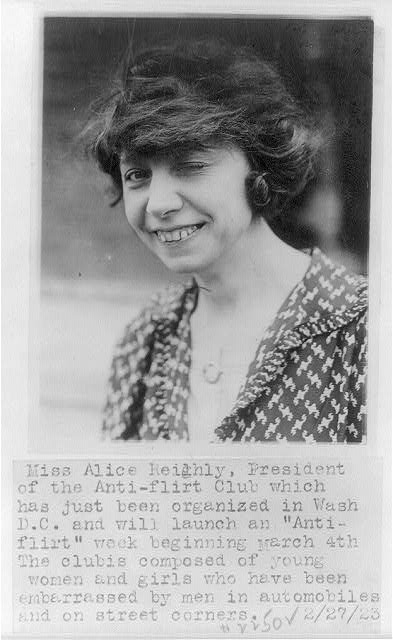
President Alice Reighly

The Anti-Flirt Club was an American club active in Washington, D.C., during the early 1920s. The purpose of the club was to protect young women and girls who received unwelcome attention from men in automobiles and on street corners. The Anti-Flirt Club launched an "Anti-Flirt" week, which began on March 4, 1923.

The club had a series of rules, which were intended as sound and serious advice. These were:

1. Don't flirt: those who flirt in haste often repent in leisure.
2. Don't accept rides from flirting motorists—they don't invite you in to save you a walk.
3. Don't use your eyes for ogling—they were made for worthier purposes.
4. Don't go out with men you don't know—they may be married, and you may be in for a hair-pulling match.
5. Don't wink—a flutter of one eye may cause a tear in the other.
6. Don't smile at flirtatious strangers—save them for people you know.
7. Don't annex all the men you can get—by flirting with many, you may lose out on the one.
8. Don't fall for the slick, dandified cake eater—the unpolished gold of a real man is worth more than the gloss of a lounge lizard.
9. Don't let elderly men with an eye to a flirtation pat you on the shoulder and take a fatherly interest in you. Those are usually the kind who want to forget they are fathers.
10. Don't ignore the man you are sure of while you flirt with another. When you return to the first one you may find him gone.

An article in The Washington Post from February 28, 1923, titled "10 Girls Start War on Auto Invitation", laid out the problem: "Too many motorists are taking advantage of the precedent established during the war by offering to take young lady pedestrians in their cars, Miss Helen Brown, 639 Longfellow Street, declared yesterday." Brown, the secretary of the nascent Anti-Flirt club, warned that these men "don't all tender their invitations to save the girls a walk", and while there were "other varieties of flirts", motorists were the absolute worst.

Brown, along with the president—a Miss Alice Reighly of 1400 Harvard Street NW—made their plan of action known. On March 4, 1923, the first-ever Anti-Flirt Week (and only since) would commence.

Other Anti-Flirt Clubs were started in New York, Chicago and other cities, but their focus was apparently on the "mashers" who went after women on the streets, succeeding in getting police to arrest some.

== See also ==
- Cat-calling
- Curb crawler
- Male gaze
- Wolf-whistling
