= Femme de la rue =

- Directed by: Sofie Peeters
- Release date: 2012
- Running time: 25 minutes
- Country: Belgium

Femme de la rue (Woman of the street) is a 2012 Belgian documentary made by Sofie Peeters. It runs for 25 minutes and deals with the subject of sexual harassment against women in the city of Brussels. The documentary was broadcast by Canvas on 26 July 2012. It caused a lot of controversy in both Belgian and Dutch politics about penalizing the harassment of women.

== Background ==
Sofie Peeters, the author of the documentary, was a student of audiovisual arts at Royal Institute for Theatre, Cinema and Sound (RITCS) at the time of filming. She had moved to Brussels for these studies, where she was harassed on a daily basis by men on the streets. She decided to film those experiences and turn them into a documentary on sexual street harassment.

The documentary makes use of a hidden camera. A young woman walks through the streets of Brussels while carrying a hidden camera. The main spots she passes by are the Boulevard Maurice Lemonnier (Maurice Lemonnierlaan) and the Place Anneessens (Anneessensplein). During the walk, she is continuously bothered by men who yell at her, offend her, and try to impose themselves on her. Nearly all of Peeters' offenders were of North African origin which led to a debate about a cultural border, which was not the intention of the author but was shown to be important to consider. The documentary also features women of both indigenous and immigrant backgrounds who talk about their experiences while walking the streets of Brussels.
