= Confidentiality club =

Agreement to share confidential documents within a litigation context

In English legal proceedings, a confidentiality club (also known as confidentiality ring) is an agreement occasionally reached by parties to a litigation to reduce the risk of confidential documents being used outside the litigation. The agreement typically provides that only specified persons can access some documents. Setting up a confidentiality club "requires some degree of cooperation between the parties".

Confidentiality rings or clubs were described in 2012 as being increasingly common; the case report on Roche Diagnostics Ltd. v Mid Yorkshire Hospitals NHS Trust, a public procurement dispute, also notes that they are "common in cases of this kind", and allow for specific disclosure of documents without causing the "difficulty relating to confidentiality" which would otherwise arise, while in another public procurement case, Croft House Care et al. v Durham County Council (2010), it was noted by counsel for one of the litigants, and agreed by Ramsey J, that a small business would not be in a position to isolate certain directors within a confidentiality ring and subsequently exclude them from business decision-making.

== See also ==
- Filing under seal
- Joint defense privilege
