= Street harassment =

Harassment occurring in a public setting

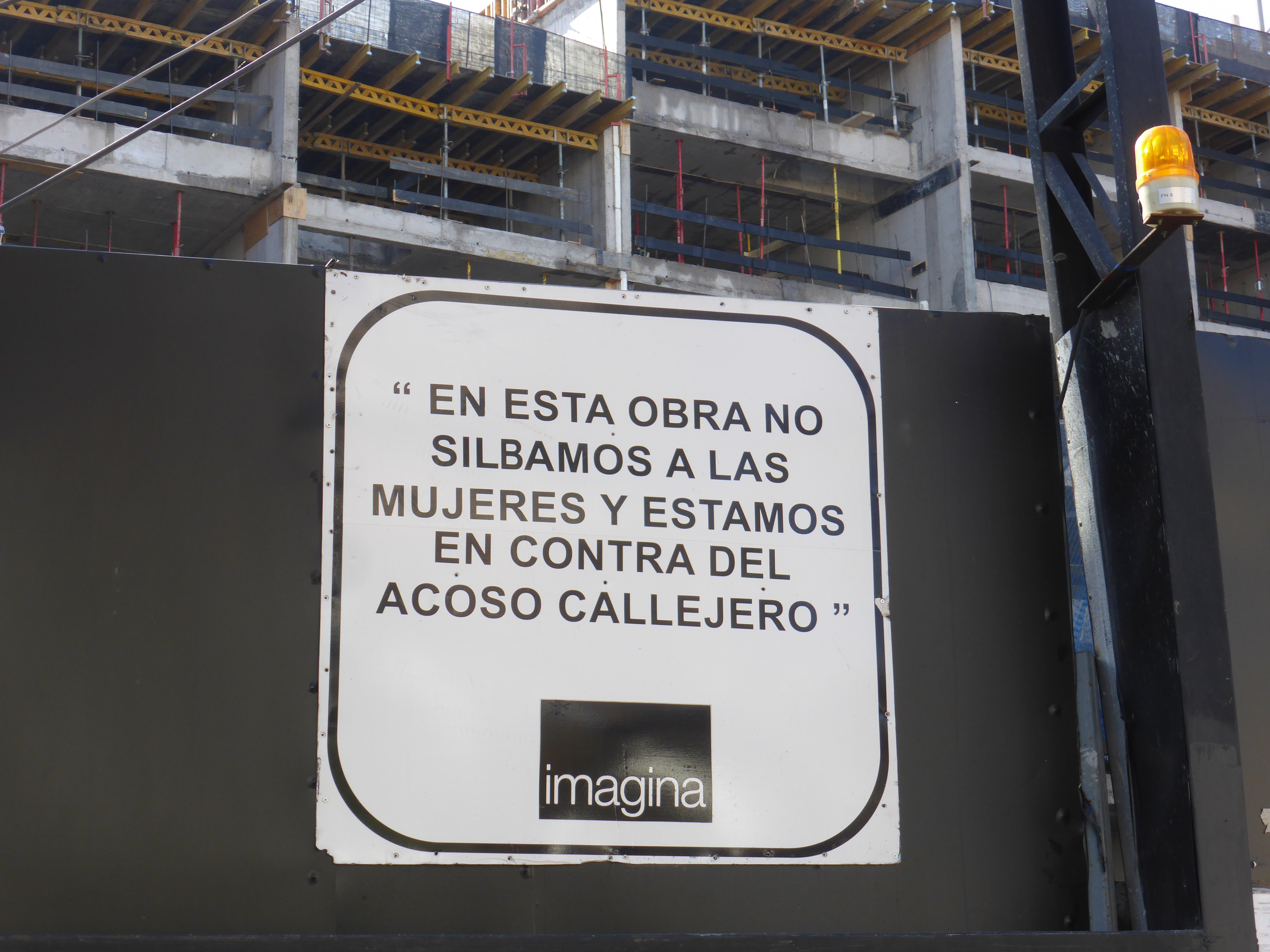
"In this construction site we do not whistle at women and we are against street harassment." Poster at a construction site in Santiago de Chile in 2020.

Street harassment is a form of harassment, primarily sexual harassment that consists of unwanted sexualised comments, provocative gestures, honking, wolf whistles, indecent exposures, stalking, persistent sexual advances, and groping by strangers in public areas such as streets, shopping malls, public transportation, and college campuses. Besides actions or comments that contain a sexual connotation, it often includes homophobic and transphobic slurs, and hateful comments referencing race, religion, class, ethnicity and disability. The practice is rooted in power and control and is often a reflection of societal discrimination, and has been argued to sometimes result from a lack of opportunities for expression of interest or affection (e.g. an inability to have social interaction).

Recipients include people of any gender, but women are much more commonly victims of harassment by men. According to Harvard Law Review (1993), street harassment is considered harassment done primarily by male strangers to females in public places.

According to the founder of Stop Street Harassment, it can range from physically harmless behavior, such as "kissing noises", "stares", and "non-sexually explicit comments", to "more threatening behavior" like stalking, flashing, grabbing, sexual assault, and rape.

== History ==
In the 19th century London, street harassment came into the spotlight as a social issue. The emergence of new shopping districts near the West End caused many middle-class women to walk through traditionally male-dominated neighborhoods to purchase the latest goods. Women sometimes found themselves questioned and followed by men who worked in the area. The men's behaviors resembled contemporary working-class courtship rituals. In such rituals, a young man would show his preference for a woman by "glad-eyeing" her in the street, and the woman would respond by slowing down her pace.

According to Judith R. Walkowitz, the public's perception of street harassment was shaped by the middle-class women who were the new subjects of this courtship practice, which was perceived to be far too casual and informal to be proper. Their experience was given a greater weight by the society than those of working-class women. Leading ladies' journals of the era contained advice on how to avoid being "spoken to" by men when going about their business.

The modern discussion regarding the subject began in 1944 with the rape of Recy Taylor. Rosa Parks was commissioned to investigate the crime in which Taylor, a black woman, was kidnapped and gang-raped in Abbeville, Alabama. Parks responded by starting what was later dubbed the "strongest campaign for equal justice to be seen in a decade."

== Effects of street harassment ==
Physical responses, physical safety, emotional reactions, and psychological symptoms are the effects of street harassment. Physical effects can also be discussed in terms of the physical safety of a woman. Recipients of harassment describe physical symptoms as muscle tension, having trouble breathing, dizziness, and nausea. Street harassment evokes from its targets emotional responses that range from moderate annoyance to intense fear. Two themes repeatedly appear in women's responses to inquiries about the experience of harassment: the intrusion upon privacy and the fear of rape. Some scholars deem that comments and conduct of a harasser reduce women to sexual objects and force this perception upon his target. Harassment may also teach women to be ashamed of their bodies and to associate their bodies with fear and humiliation through reflections of self-blame. A study published in 2010 reported that the experience of street harassment is directly related to a greater preoccupation with physical appearance and body shame, and is indirectly related to heightened fears of rape.

Street harassment severely restricts the physical and geographical mobility of women. It not only diminishes a woman's feelings of safety and comfort in public places, but also restricts her freedom of movement, depriving her of liberty and security in the public sphere. Women assess their surroundings, restrict choices of clothing, wear headphones, choose to exercise inside, and avoid certain neighborhoods or routes as proactive measures to reduce the chance of being harassed. In recent studies, street harassment was linked to indirect consequences that decrease the quality of women's lives. The decrease in quality of life is contributed to avoidant behaviors.

A study in 2011 was aimed at recording the health effects of street harassment on women and girls. It was found that they were mentally stressed after experiencing street harassment. Poor mental health has been found to be linked to street harassment caused by paranoia that certain spaces are not safe. The main way the women and girls put a stop to this was reducing the amount of time they spent on the street. However, this negatively impacted their ability to hold down a job or go to where they could receive healthcare. Stranger harassment reduces feelings of safety while walking alone at night, using public transportation, walking alone in a parking garage, and while home alone at night.

A 2000 article, based on Canada's Violence Against Women Survey, showed that past exposure to harassment from strangers is an important factor in women's perceptions of their safety in public. Harassment from a stranger, as opposed to an acquaintance, is more likely to induce fear of sexual victimization.

== Prevalence ==
- 80% of women endure at least occasional street harassment
- 45% (at least monthly) avoids going alone to public spaces after dark
- 50% (at least monthly) have to find alternate routes to their destinations
- 80% (at least monthly) feel the need to be constantly alert when traversing local streets
- 9% have had to switch careers to escape the area in which harassment occurred.

This problem is not only transnational, but also transcultural and affects people of all identities, races, and ages—every day.

=== Australia ===
A study done in Australia shows that almost 90% of women have experienced verbal or physical harassment in public one or more times in their lives. In Afghanistan, research done in the same year indicates that the prevalence of harassment was 93%. Canadian and Egyptian studies show that the rate of incidence is approximately 85% of women experiencing street harassment in the past year. In U.S.-based research, it was reported that women experienced stranger harassment on a monthly basis (41%), while a large minority reported experiencing harassment once every few days (31%). These statistics are given to show a sense of the phenomenon as widely construed, not taken as representative of the same phenomenon comparable across contexts.

=== Canada ===
The Canadian government sponsored a large survey in 1993 called the Violence Against Women Survey. In the sample of over 12,000 women, 85% said they were victims of harassment by a stranger.

=== China ===
In a 2002 survey of Beijing residents, 58% cited public buses as a common location for sexual harassment.

=== Egypt ===
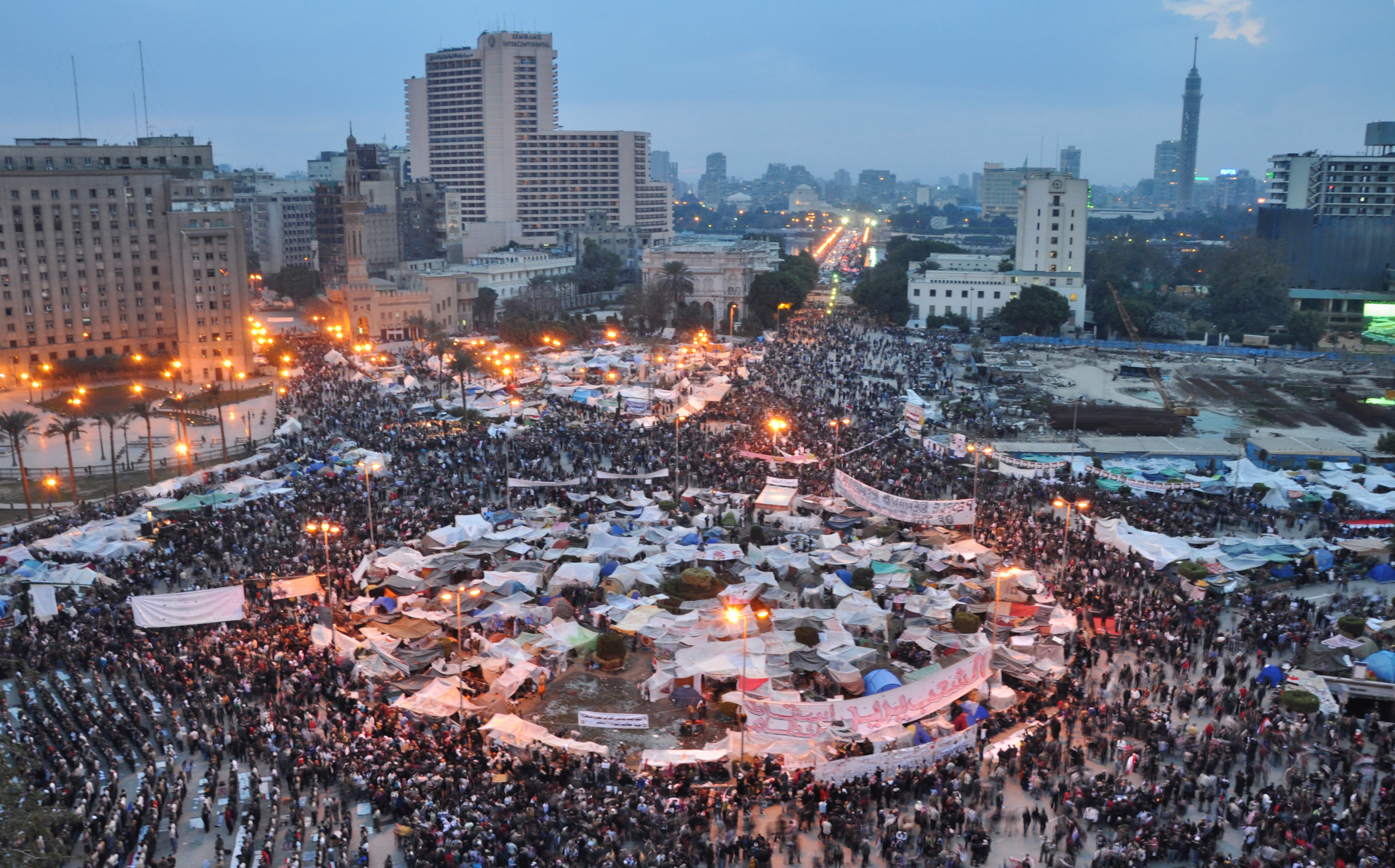
Tahrir Square, Cairo, where hundreds of women have been pulled into crowds and sexually assaulted by men. The attacks sometimes last for hours.

A 2008 survey found that 83% of Egyptian women said they had experienced sexual harassment, as did 98% of women from overseas while in Egypt. A 2013 study in Egypt by UN Women found that 99.3% of female respondents said they had been sexually harassed.

Five hundred cases of mass sexual assault in Egypt were documented between June 2012 and June 2014.

=== Spain ===
In 2020, the Catalan government found out that 17% of all violent activities in the territory occur on public transport, with women accounting for 60% of the victims. 91.6% of women aged 16 to 25 reported being harassed on public transit.

=== United States ===
A survey of 2,000 Americans was commissioned in 2014 by activist group Stop Street Harassment and conducted by GfK. 25% of men and 65% of women reported having been the victims of street harassment in their lives. 41% of women and 16% of men said they had been physically harassed in some way, such as by being followed, flashed, or groped. The perpetrators are lone men in 70% of cases for female victims and 48% of cases for male victims; 20% of men who were harassed were the victims of a lone woman. For men, the most common harassment was homophobic or transphobic slurs, followed by unwanted following, then catcalling and comments on body parts. For women, the most common harassment was catcalling, followed by comments on body parts, unwanted touching or brushing up against, and then sexual slurs like "bitch" or "slut".

For women, most harassment is performed by a total stranger. This comes from a 1990s study from the American Midwest. It was found that numerous women have experienced street harassment on numerous occasions. Another 50% were physically harassed or followed by such strangers. Half of those surveyed revealed this harassment occurred by their 17th birthday. In 2014, researchers from Cornell University and Hollaback! conducted the largest international cross-cultural study on street harassment. The data suggests that the majority of females have their first street harassment experience during puberty. According to Stop Street Harassment, "In 2014, nationally representative survey of street harassment in the USA, half of the harassed persons were harassed by age 17." They also state that, "In an informal international online 2008 study of 811 women conducted by Stop Street Harassment, almost 1 in 4 women had experienced street harassment by age 12 (7th grade) and nearly 90% by age 19".

== LGBT community ==
66% of LGBT respondents in a 2012 European Union survey said that they avoid holding hands in public for fear of harassment and assault. 50% said they avoid certain places or locations, and the places they listed as most unsafe to be open about their sexual orientations were "public transport" and "street, square, car parking lot, or other public space."

According to the Stop Street Harassment national survey, LGBT men are 17% more likely to experience physically aggressive harassment and 20% more likely to encounter verbal harassment than heterosexual men. In a separate survey, verbal harassment was cited as the most common form of abuse. However, there were also a significant number of people who were harassed by being denied service or being physically harassed.

Research from Patrick McNeil at George Washington University in 2014 showed that 90% of participants in his survey of gay and bisexual men said that they felt "unwelcome in public because of their sexual orientation." 73% said that they experienced specific homophobic and biphobic comments targeted towards them in the past year. Almost 70% reported that by age 19 they had experienced "negative public interactions", and 90% said that they had experienced these negative interactions by age 24. Some members of the LGBTQ+ community are strongly impacted by street harassment. 5% of the group surveyed said that they had moved to different neighborhoods in response to interactions they had experienced, and 3% reported a change in job in response to being harassed in the area of their job.

In a national survey in the United States done by the Human Rights Campaign, women were found to be more likely to experience street harassment, and 60% of women reported being harassed at some point in their lives. "Among LGBT youth, 51 percent have been verbally harassed at school, compared to 25 percent among non-LGBT students."

A Harvard study published in 2017 found that in a group of 489 LGBTQ+ Americans, 57% of them had been subjected to slurs. It was also found that 53% of those surveyed had experienced offensive comments. In addition to this, most of those surveyed mentioned a friend or family member who was also a part of the LGBTQ+ community that had been harassed. 57% said their friend or family member was threatened or harassed, 51% said their friend or family member had been sexually harassed, and 51% reported that they had someone in their lives who had experienced physical violence because of their sexuality or gender. The study also found that LGBTQ+ people of color are twice as likely to be harassed on the street or elsewhere than their white counterparts.

A sample survey of 331 LGBTQ men in 2014 indicated the phenomena occurs worldwide. 90% of them claimed to be harassed in public spaces for their perceived differences. It was mainly their lack of traditionally masculine features that singled them out for abuse. This abuse was mainly aimed at how they did not fit typical gender roles while in public.

In a municipality near Barcelona, called Santa Coloma de Grammet, awareness days were planned for 400 staff who have regular interactions with passengers. This was part of an initiative known as puntos violetas (purple points), to enable the staff to respond to situations of harassment of LGBTIQ+ phobia. On peak days for travel, purple spots will be installed in seven metro stations.

== Motivation ==
According to a study of street harassment in Egypt, Lebanon, Morocco, and Palestine cited in a 2017 NPR article, men who are more educated are more likely to street harass. The researchers explain that "young men with secondary-level education were more likely to sexually harass women than their older, less-educated peers". The researchers for this study explain that the main reason that men street harass is to assert their power. They do this because they have stressors in their life such as providing for their families, high unemployment rates, and political instability in their country. The NPR article states that the men "have high aspirations for themselves and aren't able to meet them, so they [harass women] to put them in their place. They feel like the world owes them". The study found that many men street harass simply for their entertainment; it is a way to release their stress: "When the men in the survey were asked why they sexually harassed women in public, the vast majority, up to 90 percent in some places, said they did it for fun and excitement".

In some cases, men may enjoy the thrill of doing something illegal or taboo, and some may experience sexual gratification from groping, flirting, or sexual humiliation. Negative remarks can also be the result of transphobia or homophobia.

According to Dr. Joe Herbert, a neuroscience professor at Cambridge, harassment also comes from a biological need to find a mate. Unlike other animals, the human brain can cognitively recognize that power dynamics and psychological and physical manipulation can be forcefully used on other humans to coerce them into becoming mates. Because of societal structures and laws, it is more attractive to most people to use psychological methods, which manifests in different forms of harassment. According to Dr. Herbert, street harassment is another form of sexual coercion to encourage reproduction that is not widely socially acceptable.

Australian reporter Eleanor Gordon-Smith recorded interactions in the 2010s in Kings Cross, New South Wales, and found that men who catcalled women enjoyed getting attention, flirting, and the public performance. The men were also under the impression that the women who were the subject of their remarks and gestures enjoyed the attention and believed they were helping the women have a good time or were giving a compliment about physical appearance that would be appreciated. The vast majority of women in the area, in contrast, found such conduct degrading, wished they could avoid it, and worried that it could escalate into a physical assault. In conversation with one man in particular who perceived his catcalling to be welcome based on his experience, Gordon-Smith pointed out that women may feel pressured to play along and pretend to enjoy the attention as a means of de-escalating the situation, fearing the response their honest reaction could provoke.

== Public attitudes ==
Female recipients of street harassment react differently to both innocent and uncivil attitudes they receive from men. However, in the context of cultural differences, many women's responses to street "remarks" are seen as favorable compliments. Author Elizabeth Arveda Kissling's research reveals that many female tourists traveling in different countries witness forms of street harassment that are seemingly less severe such as wolf-whistling and following and they consider those actions as ego-boosters rather than an inconvenience. Whether street harassment is read as flattering or offensive, some researchers say it is considered an arbitrary action that dehumanizes people.

YouGov conducted a poll of about 1,000 Americans in August 2014. In their findings, 72% said it was never appropriate to make a "catcall", 18% said it was sometimes appropriate to catcall, and 2% said it was always acceptable. The majority (55%) labeled catcalling "harassment", while 20% called it "complimentary". Americans in the 18–29 age range were the most likely to categorize catcalling as complimentary.

The vast majority of women in the Kings Cross area study found such conduct degrading, wished they could avoid it, and worried that it could escalate into a physical assault. In a more representative sample, a 2014 U.S. survey found that 68% of harassed women and 49% of harassed men were "very or somewhat concerned" the situation would escalate. As mentioned above, Gordon-Smith pointed out a reason for the difference may be that pretending to enjoy the attention was one way to avoid provoking an escalation which could lead to a physical attack. The U.S. survey found 31% of women responded by going out with other people instead of alone, and 4% of all victims made a major life change to avoid harassment, like moving or quitting a job.

Many theorists see the female's positive reaction to street harassment as a form of gender discrimination and how male hierarchy is being forced upon females. Mild street harassment is likely to be seen harmless and welcoming to some women; thus some theorists evaluate these women as the "victims of false consciousness" who lack self-value and feminism within them.

=== Cultural factors ===
Cultural factors are flexible; therefore, different nationalities can have different reactions regarding street harassment. In much of South Asia, public sexual harassment of women is called "eve teasing". The Spanish term piropos most widely used in Mexico holds a similar effect. Studies show that what is considered street harassment is similar around the globe. Many perpetrators of these actions would not characterize them as harassment, though most recipients would. Hostile environments can be interpreted differently depending on cultural norms. Studies show that the US holds "discriminatory nature" views, whereas Europe holds "violation of individual dignity" meaning that the United States focuses on the prejudiced side of harassment and Europe focuses on the invasion of personal space. In the bigger picture, the US tends to emphasize social rules, and Europe highlights the ethical and moral elements of street harassment. Cross-cultural research of sexual harassment contrasts individualist countries such as the United States, Canada, Germany, and the Netherlands with collectivist countries such as Ecuador, Pakistan, Turkey, the Philippines, and Taiwan, and says people in individualist countries are more likely to experience and be offended by sexual harassment than those from collectivist countries. Brazilians see sexual tendencies as an innocent, friendly and harmless romantic behavior, while Americans view it as a form of aggression, hierarchy, and abuse. Harassment is also disproportionately directed at people who are perceived by passers-by as having a marginalised gender identity or sexual orientation.

== Representation in media ==
The mainstream media has been criticized for representing sexual and street harassment using overly simplified narratives, framing issues as a reflection of individual aberration, usually highlighting aspects of misconduct by one party against another. While humanities and feminist scholarship identify any degree of sexual harassment as a manifestation of gendered oppression and discrimination in society, seldom do mainstream media sources report that harassment derives from systemic gender inequality or introduce dialogue in the context of broader issues.

Mainstream media has also been criticized for the overuse of invalidating rhetoric in their description of harassment. As with other forms of oppression against women, the language presented by media sources commonly undermines the validity of street harassment complaints. The particular overuse of the words, "alleged," "supposed," "expected," immediately create a sense of uncertainty toward claims of harassment and assault, therefore imposing a sense of responsibility and/or guilt on to the victim.

== Activism ==
Public activism against street harassment has grown since the late 2000s. A group called Stop Street Harassment began as a blog in 2008 and became incorporated as a non-profit organization in 2012. The organization provides tips for dealing with street harassment in safe and assertive ways, as well as provide opportunities to "take community action". In 2010, Stop Street Harassment started the annual "International Anti-Street Harassment Week". During the third week in April, people from around the globe participated in "marches, rallies, workshops, and sidewalk chalkings" in an effort to gain attention for the issue. Another group called Hollaback! was founded in 2010.

Activists have made use of viral videos to publicize the frequency of unsolicited comments that women receive in public areas.

One American street artist used Kickstarter to raise money for a campaign called "Stop Telling Women to Smile." The artist posts portraits of herself and other young women accompanied with messages against street harassment.

A Minneapolis woman created a set of printable "Cards Against Harassment" (in homage to the game Cards Against Humanity) that she distributes to street harassers. The cards are meant to explain to street harassers why their comments are unwanted.

The Safe Cities Global Initiative created by UN-Habitat in 1996 is an approach to address harassment in public places through partnerships with cities’ communities, local organizations, and municipal governments. Actions taken to address this include improved street designs and lighting in urban areas. The United Nations Commission of the Status of Women (CSW), a subcategory under UN Women, is committed to empowering women and advocating for gender equality. For the first time, it included multiple clauses into their "Agreed Conclusions" that focused on sexual harassment in public places in March 2013.

A 2016 study in The British Journal of Criminology examines the extent to which online sites serve as a form of informal justice for street harassment victims. The results show that individuals experience "validation" or "affirmation" after self-disclosing their experiences online and may receive acknowledgment or support by doing so. Notably, some individuals feel re-victimized or experience re-traumatization. It was found that online justice is limited, but in particular for street harassment, it is possible that victims achieve some form of justice.

Plan International UK launched a campaign in 2018 called #ISayItsNotOk to stop the street harassment of girls and raise public awareness of the issue. This campaign has gotten a lot of public attention and has made girls and women in the UK share their stories of street harassment. In 2019, another group in the UK called Our Streets Now has launched a campaign to make street harassment of girls, women, and transgender individuals a criminal offense and to educate students in schools about street harassment so "girls will learn how to avoid it and boys never become perpetrators of it". Plan International UK and Our Streets Now partnered in late November 2020 to create the #CrimeNotCompliment campaign and make public sexual harassment a crime.

== Legal status ==
In some jurisdictions, some forms of street harassment are illegal.

=== France ===
In 2018, France outlawed street sexual harassment, passing a law declaring catcalling on streets and public transportation is subject to fines of up to €750, with more for more aggressive and physical behavior. The law also declared that sex between an adult and a person of under 15 can be considered rape if the younger person is judged incompetent to give consent. It also gives underage victims of rape an extra decade to file complaints, extending the deadline to 30 years from their turning 18. This law came about after many people were outraged at a man attacking a woman (Marie Laguerre) due to her response to his harassment of her.

=== Netherlands ===
In 2017, the Dutch cities of Amsterdam and Rotterdam introduced a local ban (Algemene Plaatselijke Verordening, APV) on street harassment (known as the sisverbod or 'hissing ban' in the media). In 2018, a 36-year-old man from Rotterdam was convicted to paying two fines of 100 euros by a district judge (kantonrechter) for sexually harassing 8 women on the street. In December 2019, the Court of Appeals in The Hague considered that sexual harassment had been proven, but was not illegal because the local laws were unconstitutional per Article 7 (Freedom of Expression) of the Dutch Constitution. Only the House of Representatives and the Senate are allowed to make laws (on a national level) that restrict parts of the Constitution; the municipalities of Amsterdam and Rotterdam did not have that authority, and so the earlier ruling was overturned. Several politicians were disappointed by the overturning (with MP Dilan Yeşilgöz-Zegerius arguing the approach is best locally customised rather than nationally standardised), and stated their intention to adopt national legislation on street harassment.

=== Peru ===
Peru has had anti-street harassment laws since March 2015.

=== Philippines ===
Quezon City in the Philippines, which has a high rate of street harassment, implemented an ordinance against street harassment, such as cat-calling and wolf-whistling, on May 16, 2016. Penalties for acts of street harassment were set at fines of Php 1,000 to Php 5,000 and a 1-month jail term. In 2019, Republic Act 11313, known as the Safe Spaces Act, became law in the Philippines; it punishes misogynistic acts, sexist slurs, wolf-whistling, catcalling, intrusive gazing, cursing, and persistent telling of sexual jokes in public or online. It also includes Any conduct that is unwelcome and pervasive and creates an intimidating, hostile, or humiliating environment for the recipient.

Punishments include imprisonment or fines depending on the seriousness of the crime.

=== United States ===
Across the United States, laws regarding street harassment are under the jurisdiction of individual states. In Illinois there are laws that relate to street harassment. Despite being a potential precursor to physical assault and even murder, offensive speech and hate speech are protected under the First Amendment. Although a perpetrator is legally allowed to shout obscenities, other acts such as public indecency and sexual assault are blatant violations of the law. Offensive speech and hate speech as forms of street harassment are frequently used as evidence against repeat offenders.

The public's rejection of criminalizing offensive speech and hate speech in view of the First Amendment poses a challenge for the legal system. Contrary to popular belief, it is not just those who are unaffected by street harassment that hold this ideal; victims and survivors of offensive speech and hate speech are reluctant to advocate against this First Amendment right. Adversely, the public is hesitant to rely on the law in their daily lives as they prefer autonomy, regardless of how grave the situation may be.

In a series of interviews conducted by Laura Beth Nielson in 2000, regarding the attitudes of the public in relation to the law and street harassment, four paradigms were offered. The freedom of speech paradigm is based on the ideal of allegiance to the First Amendment's ideology. The autonomy paradigm is based on the desire for self-governance. The impracticality paradigm is based on the impossibility of regulation in regards to offensive speech and hate speech. Lastly, the distrust of authority paradigm is based on the lack of faith in legal officials to enforce laws. These four paradigms exemplify the reasoning behind the lack of criminalization for street harassment.

== See also ==
- Anti-Flirt Club
- Butsukari otoko (ぶつかり男, 'Bumping man') – Japanese street harassment involving a man assaulting a woman by bumping into them, usually in a crowded place
- Femme de la rue (2012) – a Belgian documentary where a female film student walks through the streets of Brussels with a hidden camera, recording street harassment and her reaction and interaction with the men harassing her
- Subway shirt
- War Zone – a documentary on the topic
- 10 Hours of Walking in NYC as a Woman (2014) – an experiment where a woman walks through the streets of New York City with a hidden camera recording her from the front, and experiences 108 instances of what the video creators call street harassment over the course of 10 hours.

== Bibliography ==
- Ikram, Kiran. "Street Harassment of Women in Lahore; Experiences, Consequences and Reporting Mechanism". Journal of Business and Social Review in Emerging Economies 8 (2) (2, June, 2022) doi:10.26710/jbsee.v8i2
