= Arthur's =

Former gentlemen's club in London, England

Coordinates: 51°30′21″N 0°08′20″W

Arthur's was a London gentlemen's club, now dissolved, which was established in 1811 and was disbanded in 1940. Between 1827 and 1940 it was based at 69 St James's Street. It is now best remembered for having built the London clubhouse currently occupied by the Carlton Club.

The club was first formed at a meeting at a bank at 16 St James's Street on 8 May 1811, with the resolution 'That a New Club be forthwith established, to consist of 300 Members.' The club is notable for being the first to be a members' club wholly owned by the members, as opposed to the proprietary clubs which previously existed, like White's, Boodle's, and Brooks's, and it accordingly served as the mould for most of the nineteenth century members'-owned clubs which followed.

== Members ==
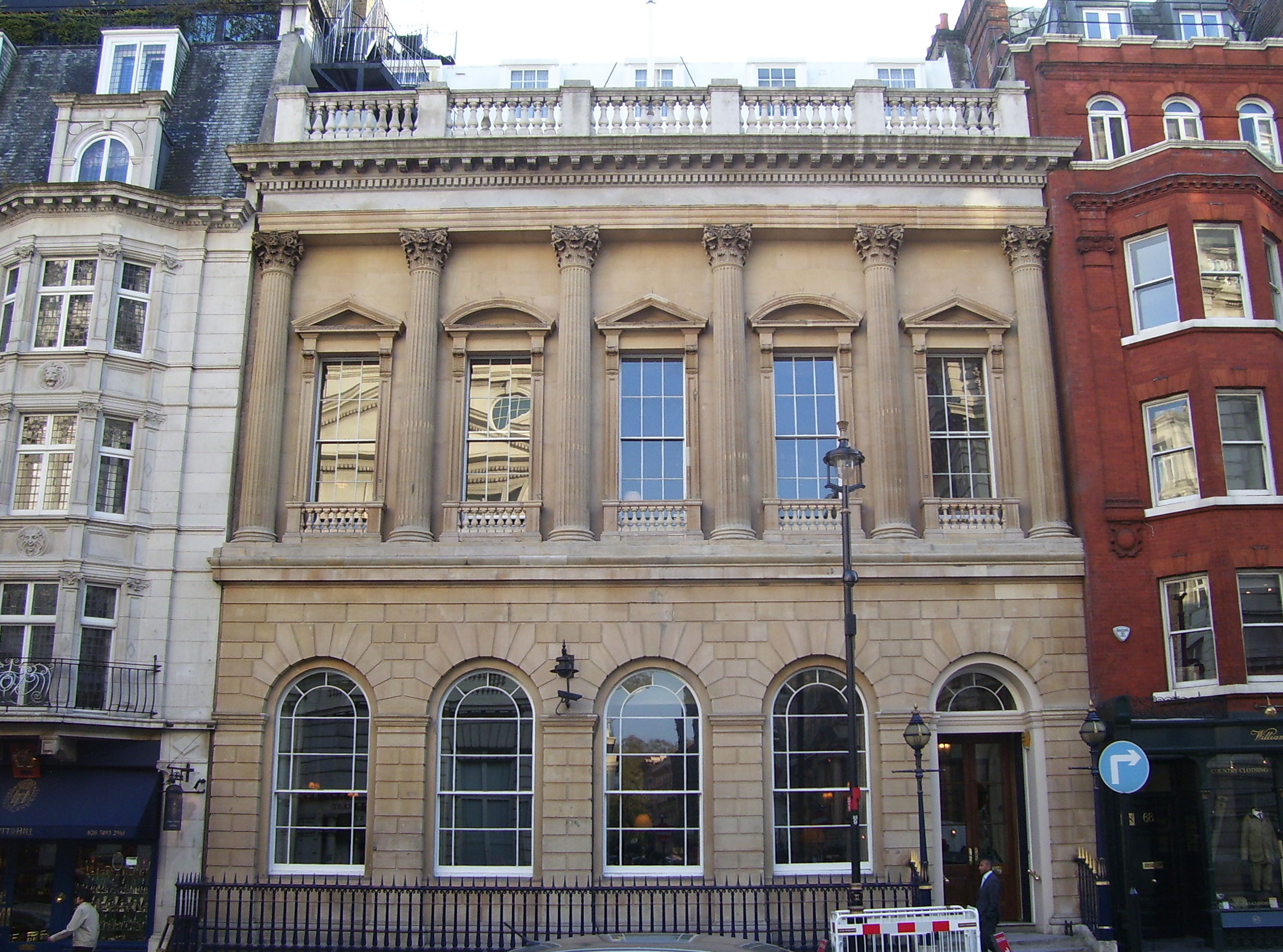
The clubhouse at 69 St James Street, occupied since 1943 by the Carlton Club

The original club committee consisted of eleven members. Six were Scots:

- Sir David Hunter Blair, baronet (son of Sir James Hunter Blair, the banker and friend of Robert Burns)
- James Hunter Blair (brother of the above, later M.P. for Wigtownshire)
- Thomas Harvie Farquhar (a member of the banking firm of Herries and Co., on whose premises in St. James's Street the meeting was held)
- The Hon. Archibald Macdonald
- The Hon. James Macdonald
- Lord Montgomerie

The other five members of the committee were:

- The Hon. Thomas Brand, M.P
- Sir Charles Burrell, Bt (M.P. for Shoreham, from a Sussex landowning family)
- Walter Burrell (from the same Sussex landowning family)
- Lieutenant Colonel John James
- William Jones
- The 10th Earl Waldegrave

== Building ==
The building was completed in 1827, and housed the club until financial pressures led to its closure in 1940. In 1941, the Carlton Club's own clubhouse in Pall Mall was destroyed after a direct hit from a bomb during the Blitz, and the Carlton acquired the old Arthur's premises – somewhat ironic as it is one of the main parties of state, whereas the Arthur's membership was always of an avowedly non-political character.

The Carlton has since then made numerous internal modifications to the building, and none of the original furniture from Arthur's remains. The memorial tablet listing those from Arthur's Club who died in World War I is now in nearby St. James's Church, Piccadilly.

== See also ==
- List of gentlemen's clubs in London
