= Carlton Club =

Gentlemen's club in London, England

- Established: 1832; 194 years ago
- Founder: Arthur Wellesley, 1st Duke of Wellington, and others
- Type: Private members' club
- Purpose: Club established for the Conservative Party
- Headquarters: 69 St James's Street
- Location: London, England
- Coordinates: 51°30′21″N 0°8′20″W
- Website: carltonclub.co.uk

The Carlton Club is a private members' club in the St James's area of London, England. It was the original home of the Conservative Party before the creation of Conservative Central Office. Membership of the club is by nomination and election only.

== History ==
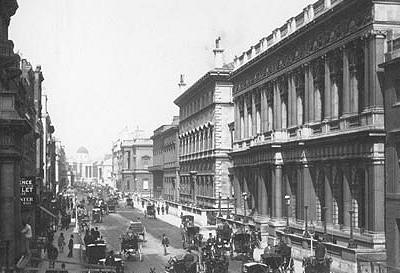
Pall Mall with the Carlton Club, photographed by James Valentine

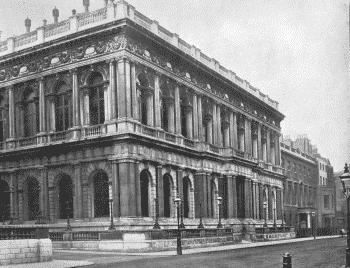
Carlton Club in Pall Mall, c. 1896

The club was founded in 1832, by Tory peers, MPs and gentlemen, as a place to coordinate party activity after the party's defeat over the First Reform Act. The 1st Duke of Wellington was a founding member; he opposed the 1832 Reform Act and its extension of the right to vote. The club played a major role in the transformation of the Tory party into its modern form as the Conservative Party. It lost its role as a central party office with the widening of the franchise after the Reform Act 1867, but it remained the principal venue for key political discussions between Conservative ministers, MPs and party managers.

=== Formation location ===
The club was formed at the Thatched House Tavern in 1832 and its first premises were in Carlton House Terrace (provided by Lord Kensington), from which it drew its name. These premises were quickly found too small. The second clubhouse was situated near the Reform Club at 94 Pall Mall, London, and was purpose-built in 1835. It was replaced by a third clubhouse on the same site in 1856.

The Caen stone used on the façade of the third building proved unsuitable in the London atmosphere and had to be completely replaced in 1923–24.

=== 1922 Carlton Club meeting ===
The club is most famous for the Carlton Club meeting of 19 October 1922, in which backbench Conservative MPs decided to withdraw from the David Lloyd George–led coalition government. MPs voted in favour of discontinuing the coalition, after speeches from Bonar Law and Stanley Baldwin, with Baldwin saying that the 'dynamic force' of Lloyd George was a danger to the stability of the Conservative party. Austen Chamberlain resigned as leader and Bonar Law formed a purely Conservative government.

=== Bombing by the Luftwaffe and move to current building ===
The club suffered a direct hit during the Blitz on 14 October 1940. Observers, including the diarist Harold Nicolson, noted Quintin Hogg (then a young Conservative MP, later the 2nd Viscount Hailsham) carrying his elderly, disabled father (Lord Hailsham) from the building; they had been dining together prior to the former's departure for active service in North Africa. The Chief Whip, David Margesson, who was living at the club since his recent divorce, was left homeless and had to sleep for a time on a makeshift bed in the underground Cabinet Annexe.

No one was killed in the explosion, but the building was destroyed. The Carlton immediately moved to its current premises at 69 St James's Street, formerly the location of Arthur's club – one of the premier gentlemen's clubs, which had closed the same year after 150 years of operations.

The current Georgian clubhouse is architecturally important (Grade II* listed) and includes two elegant dining rooms, together with a collection of political portraits and paintings dating back to the 18th century, imported from the ruins of the old clubhouse and the former Junior Carlton Club (see below). The current clubhouse has not retained any of the furnishings belonging to the building when it was Arthur's club, apart from the war memorial plaque in the entrance. There is a marble Arthur's club First World War Memorial to be found on the wall by the stairs in the main vestibule of St James's Church Piccadilly (designed by Wren). The walls of the Disraeli and Macmillan rooms and their windows at the back of the club were part of the fabric of the original White's Club building.

=== Junior Carlton Club ===
The Junior Carlton Club, which was entirely separate from the Carlton itself, was established in 1864 and occupied a large purpose-built clubhouse, completed in 1869, at 30 Pall Mall, almost opposite the Carlton. This was sold early in the 1960s and part of the proceeds used to buy the site of the former Carlton Club building at 94 Pall Mall. The erection of the new clubhouse on the site of 30 Pall Mall in a modern 1960s prototype 'club of the future' led to mass resignations from that club. In December 1977 it formally merged with the Carlton Club, with negotiations conducted by Harold Macmillan.

=== Bombing by IRA ===
At 8:39 p.m. on 25 June 1990, the Carlton Club was bombed by the Provisional Irish Republican Army (IRA), injuring more than 20 people. Lord Kaberry died the following year at age 83 from the injuries he had sustained.

=== Chris Pincher scandal ===
It was at the Carlton that Chris Pincher, the deputy chief whip, was alleged to have committed sexual assault on two men on 29 June 2022. The revelations following this scandal led to the government crisis and the resignation of the Prime Minister, Boris Johnson. The standards committee found Pincher's conduct amounted to an abuse of power and recommended he be suspended for eight weeks. Pincher initially intended to appeal the suspension, however he ultimately resigned as an MP in September 2023, triggering a by-election in his Tamworth constituency which the Conservatives lost to Labour.

== Membership ==
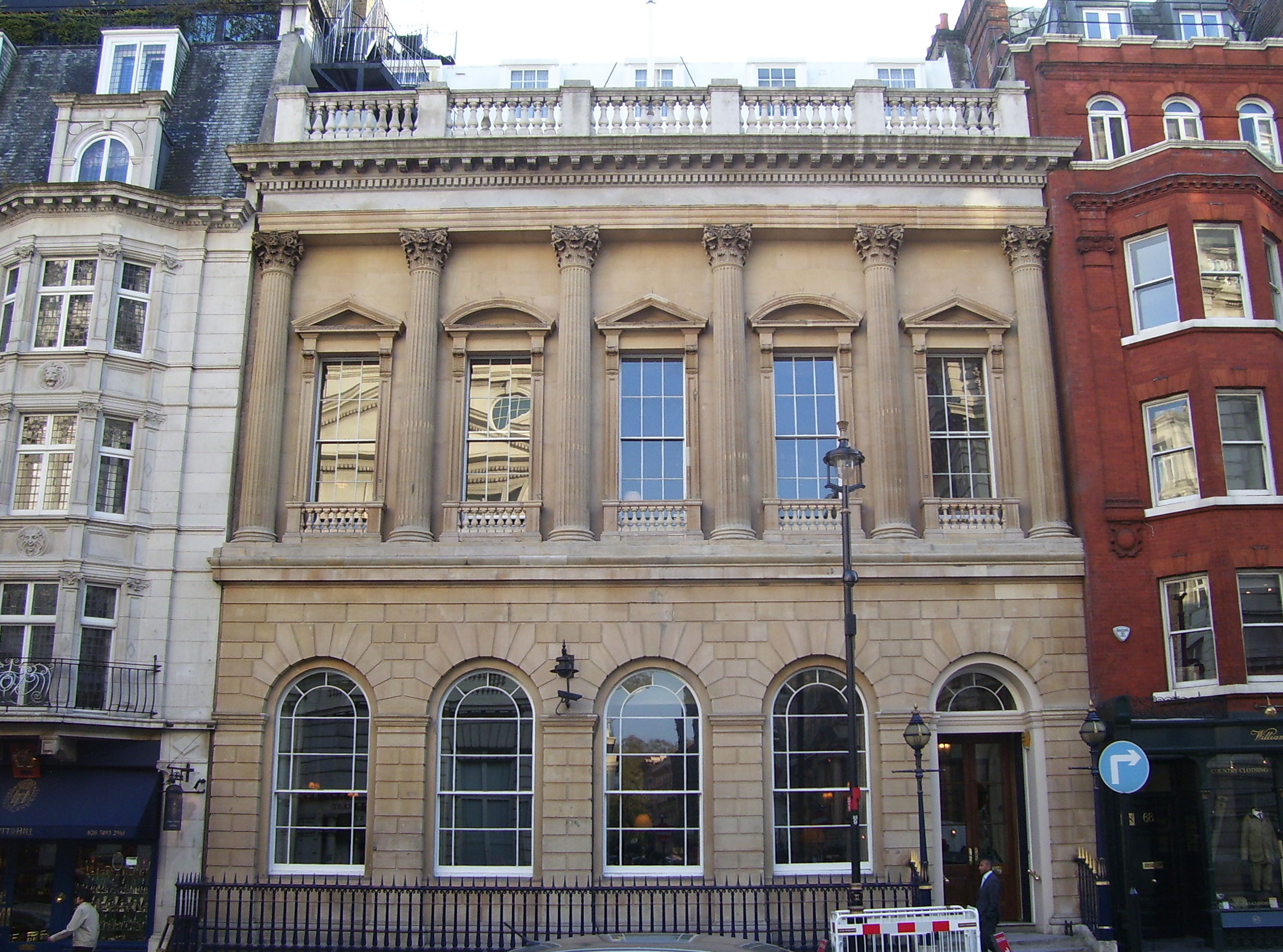
The former clubhouse of Arthur's, which the Carlton has occupied since 1940

Historically and by tradition, only gentlemen could become full members after being proposed and seconded by two current members who have known the applicant and been members themselves for at least two years. From the 1970s onwards, there were female associate members, meaning they were unable to vote. On becoming Conservative leader in 1975, Margaret Thatcher was made an honorary member of the club and, as such, until 2008 was the only female member entitled to full membership. Thatcher was elected (in May 2009) to the vacancy, as the club's second president, succeeding her only predecessor Harold Macmillan who had died in 1986.

A separate, unrelated Ladies' Carlton Club was established after the First World War as a social and political centre for Conservative women. It closed in 1958.

A full history of the club was published by historian Lord Lexden to mark its 175th anniversary in 2007.

As of 2022 the club had around 1500 members and membership cost upwards of £1700 per year.

=== Opposition to membership ===
The Prime Minister Arthur Balfour was a reluctant member, complaining about the club in the early 1900s.

The Carlton is a beastly club... but it must be suffered like long hours and constituents as a necessary though disagreeable accompaniment of a political career.

— Arthur Balfour

In 2001, Conservative Party leader Iain Duncan Smith refused Carlton Club membership when it was offered to him because women, at that time, were unable to become full members.

== Notable members ==
- Michael Ancram (Michael Kerr, 13th Marquess of Lothian)
- Stanley Baldwin
- Arthur Balfour
- Alexander Bruce, 6th Lord Balfour of Burleigh
- F. E. Smith, 1st Earl of Birkenhead
- William Bridgeman, 1st Viscount Bridgeman
- St John Brodrick
- Patrick Buchan-Hepburn
- Rab Butler
- David Cameron
- George Cave, 1st Viscount Cave
- Austen Chamberlain
- Neville Chamberlain
- John Colomb
- Harry Crookshank
- Philip Cunliffe-Lister
- Aretas Akers-Douglas, 1st Viscount Chilston
- Lord Randolph Churchill
- Winston Churchill (twice; a member 1900–5, resigned when he defected to the Liberal party, and rejoined from 1926 until his death)
- Ronald McNeill, 1st Baron Cushendun
- J. C. C. Davidson, 1st Viscount Davidson
- Jim Davidson
- Edward Stanley, 17th Earl of Derby
- Benjamin Disraeli
- Alec Douglas-Home
- Anthony Eden
- Walter Elliot
- Bolton Eyres-Monsell
- Christopher Gabbitas
- Sir John Gilmour
- William Ewart Gladstone
- William Hague
- Michael Heseltine
- Douglas Hogg, 1st Viscount Hailsham
- Douglas Hogg, 3rd Viscount Hailsham
- Quintin Hogg, Baron Hailsham of St Marylebone
- E. F. L. Wood, 1st Earl of Halifax
- Lord Claud Hamilton
- Lord George Hamilton
- Sir Samuel Hoare, 1st Viscount Templewood
- William Joynson-Hicks
- David Heathcoat-Amory
- Derick Heathcoat-Amory
- Edward Heath
- John Hick
- Boris Johnson
- David Maxwell Fyfe
- Rudyard Kipling
- George Kynoch (formerly Deputy Chairman)
- Bonar Law
- Alan Lennox-Boyd
- Geoffrey William Lloyd
- Selwyn Lloyd
- Charles Vane-Tempest-Stewart, 6th Marquess of Londonderry
- Charles Vane-Tempest-Stewart, 7th Marquess of Londonderry
- Walter Long, 1st Viscount Long
- Harold Macmillan
- Maurice Macmillan, Viscount Macmillan of Ovenden
- John Major
- Theresa May
- Percy Mills, 1st Viscount Mills
- William Morrison
- Walter Guinness, 1st Baron Moyne
- Gerald Nabarro
- Ronald Munro-Ferguson, 1st Viscount Novar
- Osbert Peake
- William Wellesley Peel, 1st Earl Peel
- Charles Ritchie, 1st Baron Ritchie of Dundee
- Robert Gascoyne-Cecil, 3rd Marquess of Salisbury
- James Gascoyne-Cecil, 4th Marquess of Salisbury
- Robert Gascoyne-Cecil, 5th Marquess of Salisbury
- Robert Gascoyne-Cecil, 7th Marquess of Salisbury
- Robert Sanders
- Guy Spier
- James Stanhope, 7th Earl Stanhope
- Sir Peter Tapsell
- Margaret Thatcher (honorary member)
- Peter Walker, Baron Walker of Worcester (former Chairman)
- William Walrond, 1st Baron Waleran
- Frederick Richard West
- Ann Widdecombe (became first full female member in June 2008; no longer a member after standing for the Brexit Party in the 2019 EU election)
- Sir Kingsley Wood
- Frederick Marquis, 1st Earl of Woolton
- George Wyndham
- Sayeeda Warsi, Baroness Warsi

== Clubhouse plans ==
Plans of the 1855 clubhouse by Sydney Smirke, and of the 1923 Portland stone re-facing by Sir Reginald Blomfield.

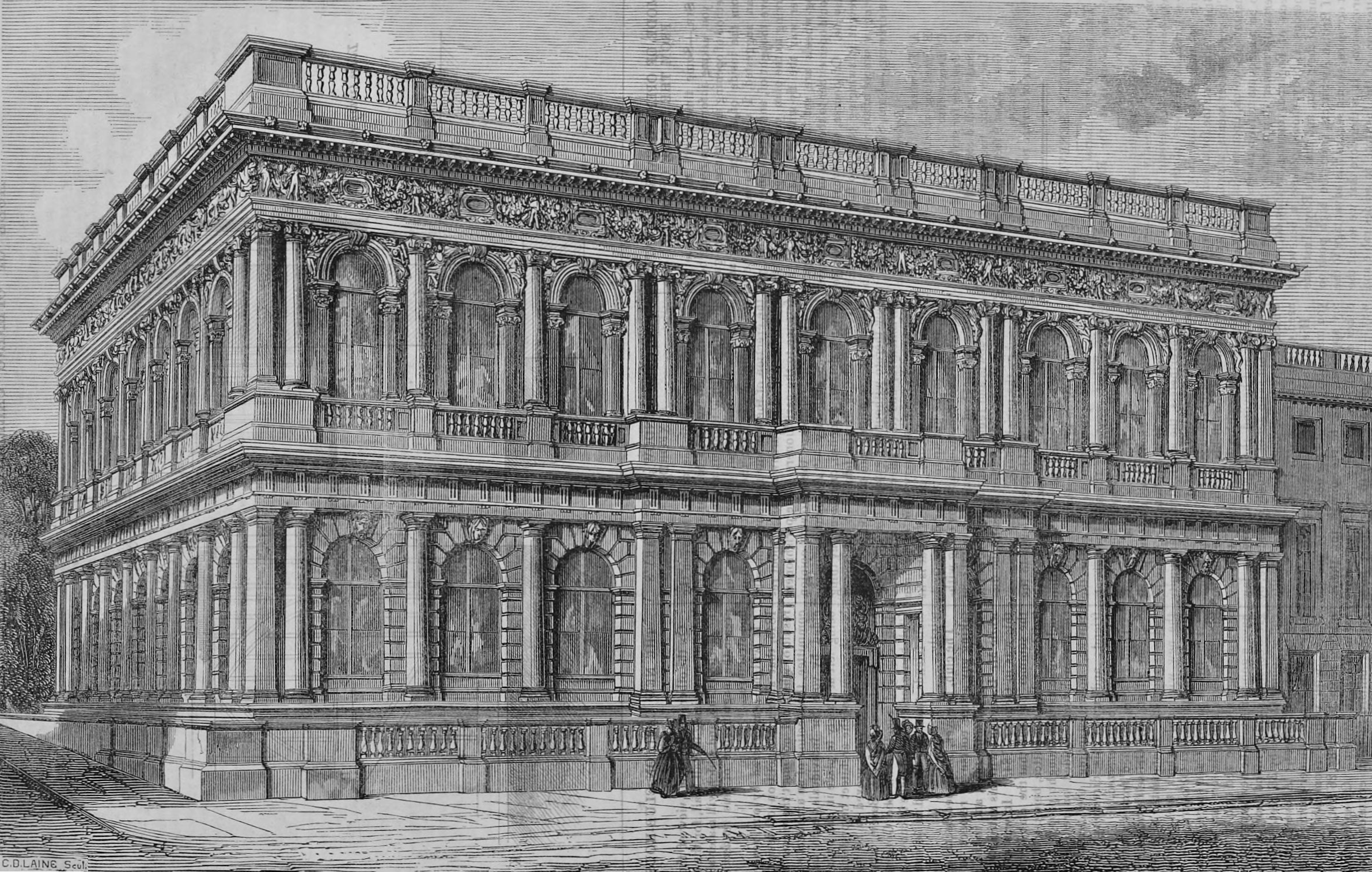
Perspective

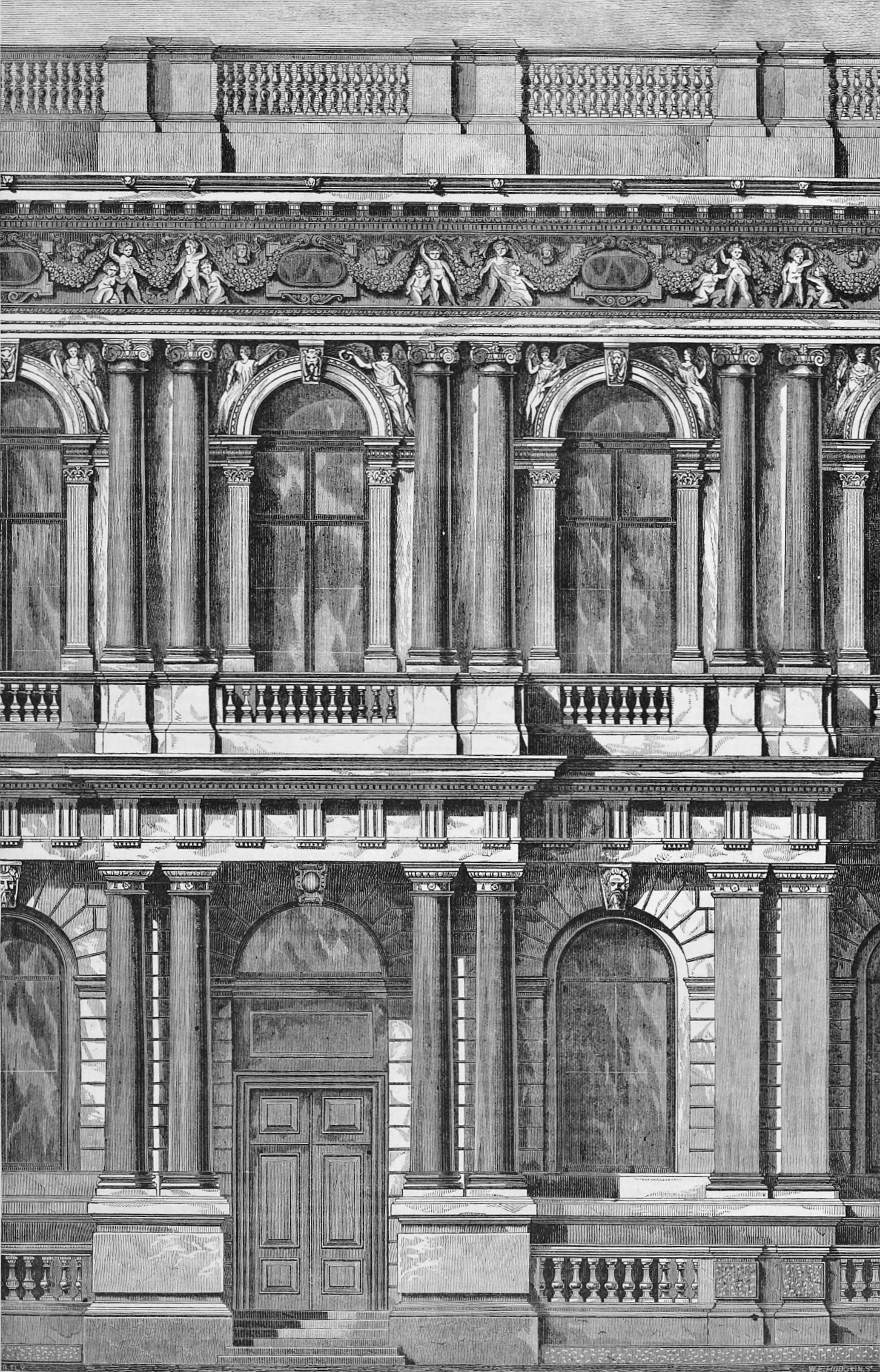
North elevation

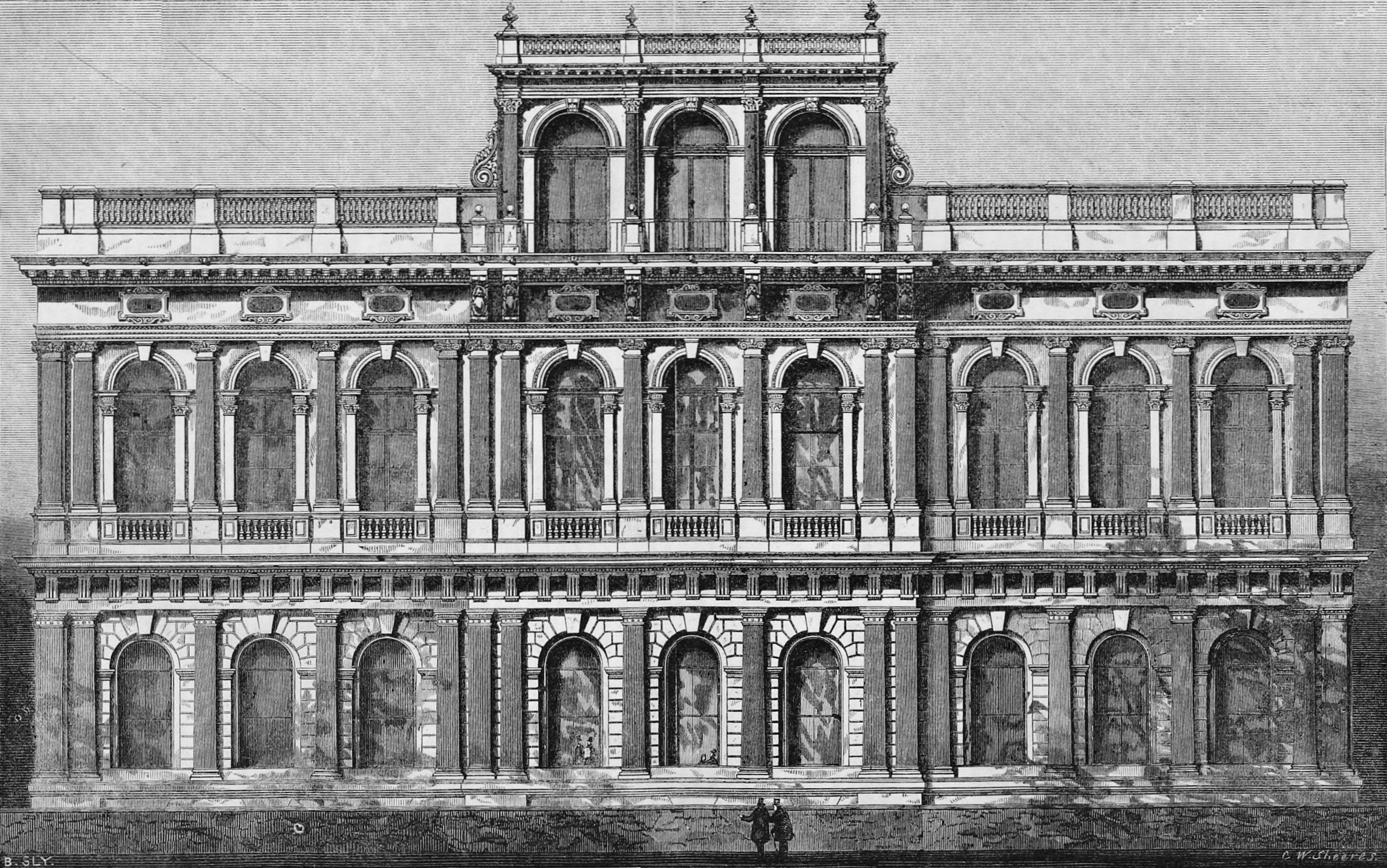
South elevation

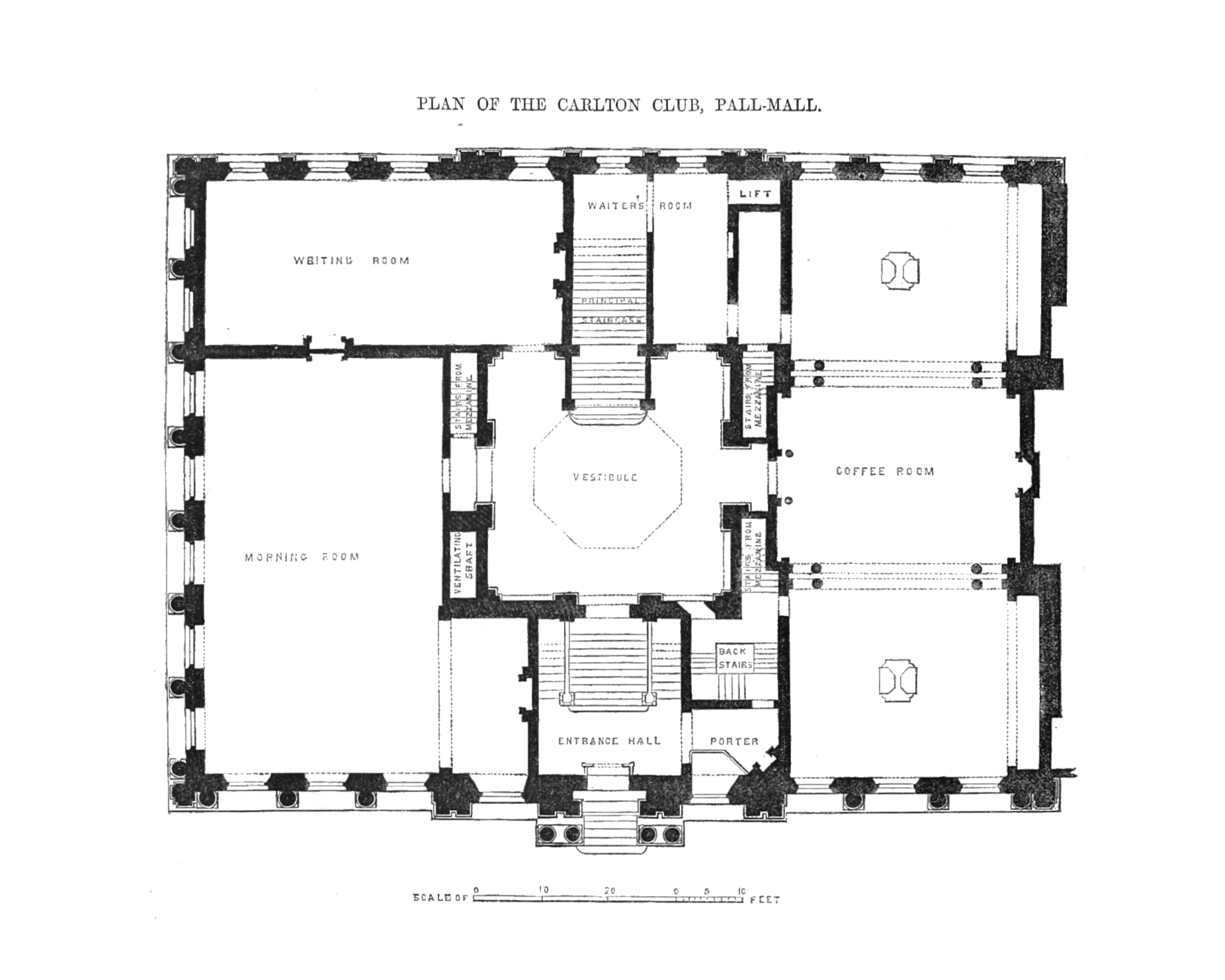
Ground floor

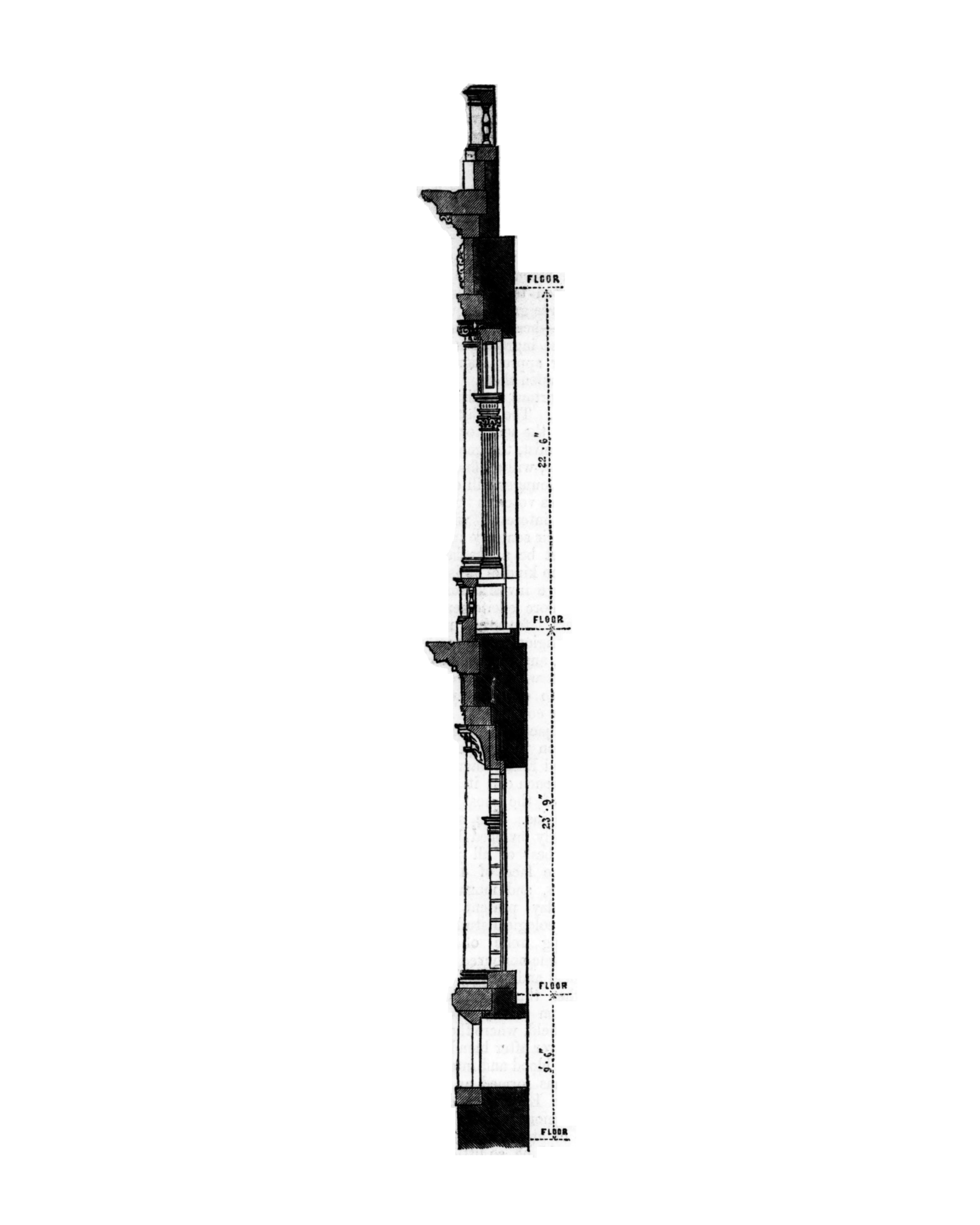
Wall section

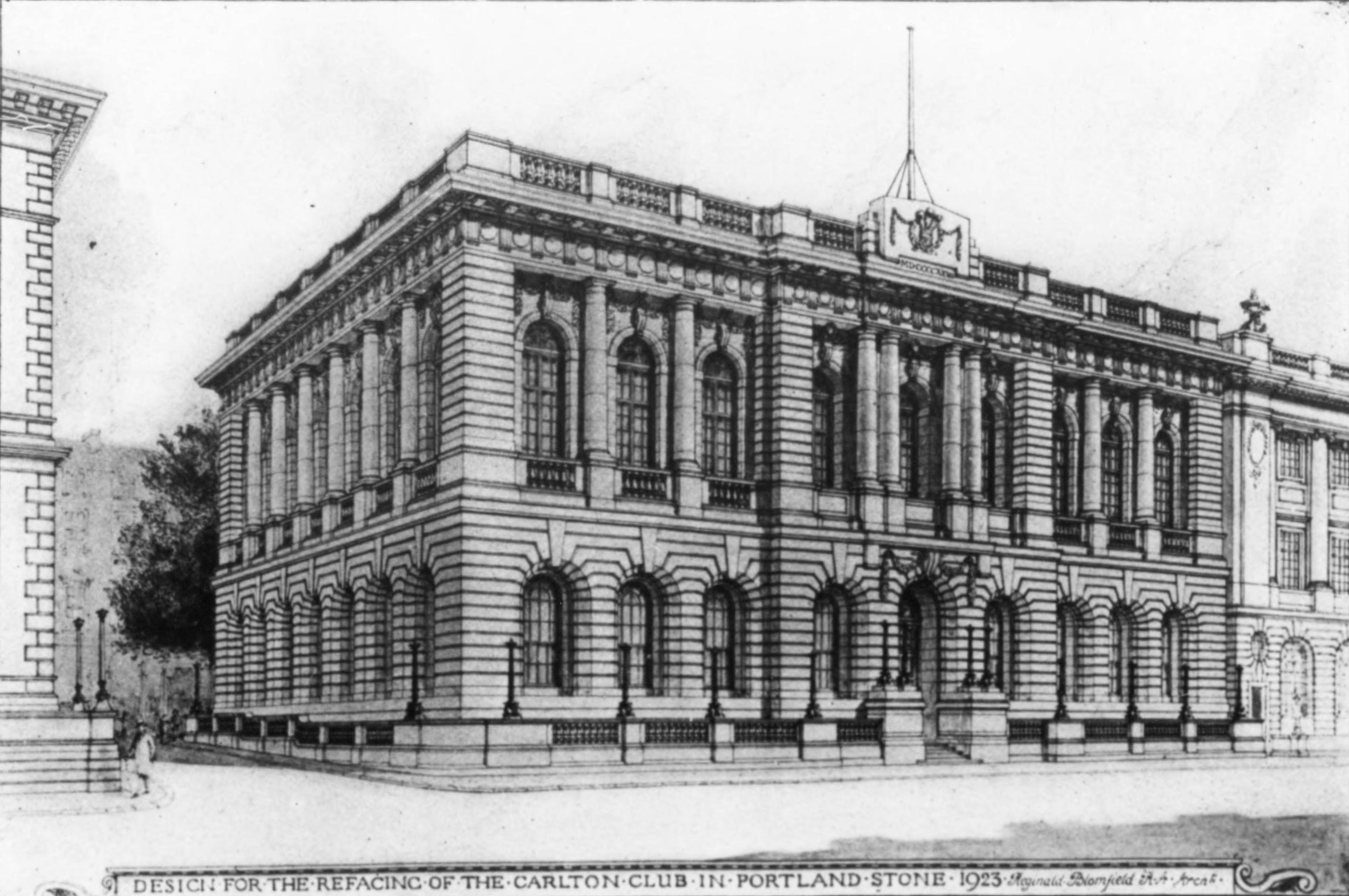
Perspective (re-facing)

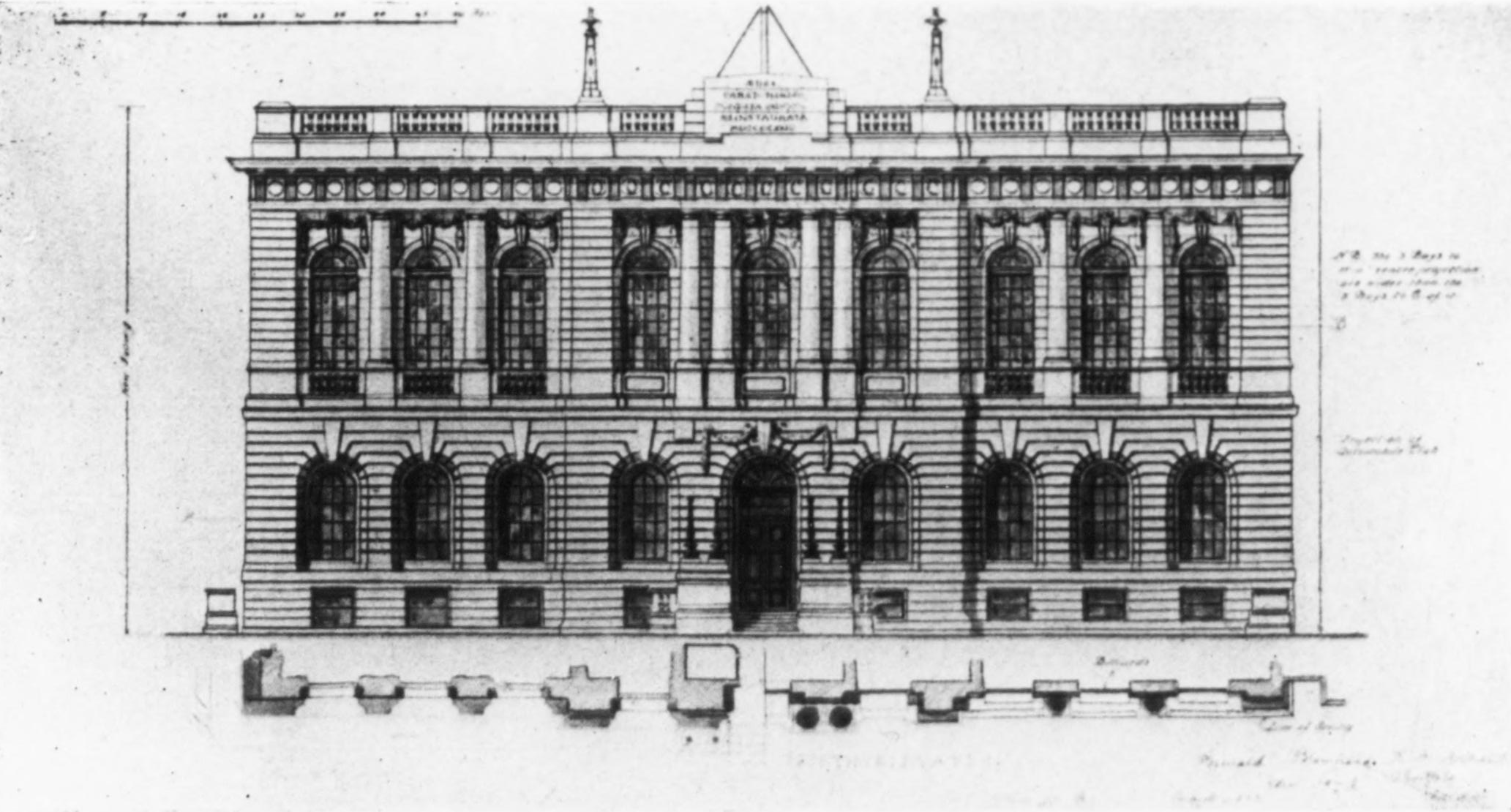
North elevation (re-facing)

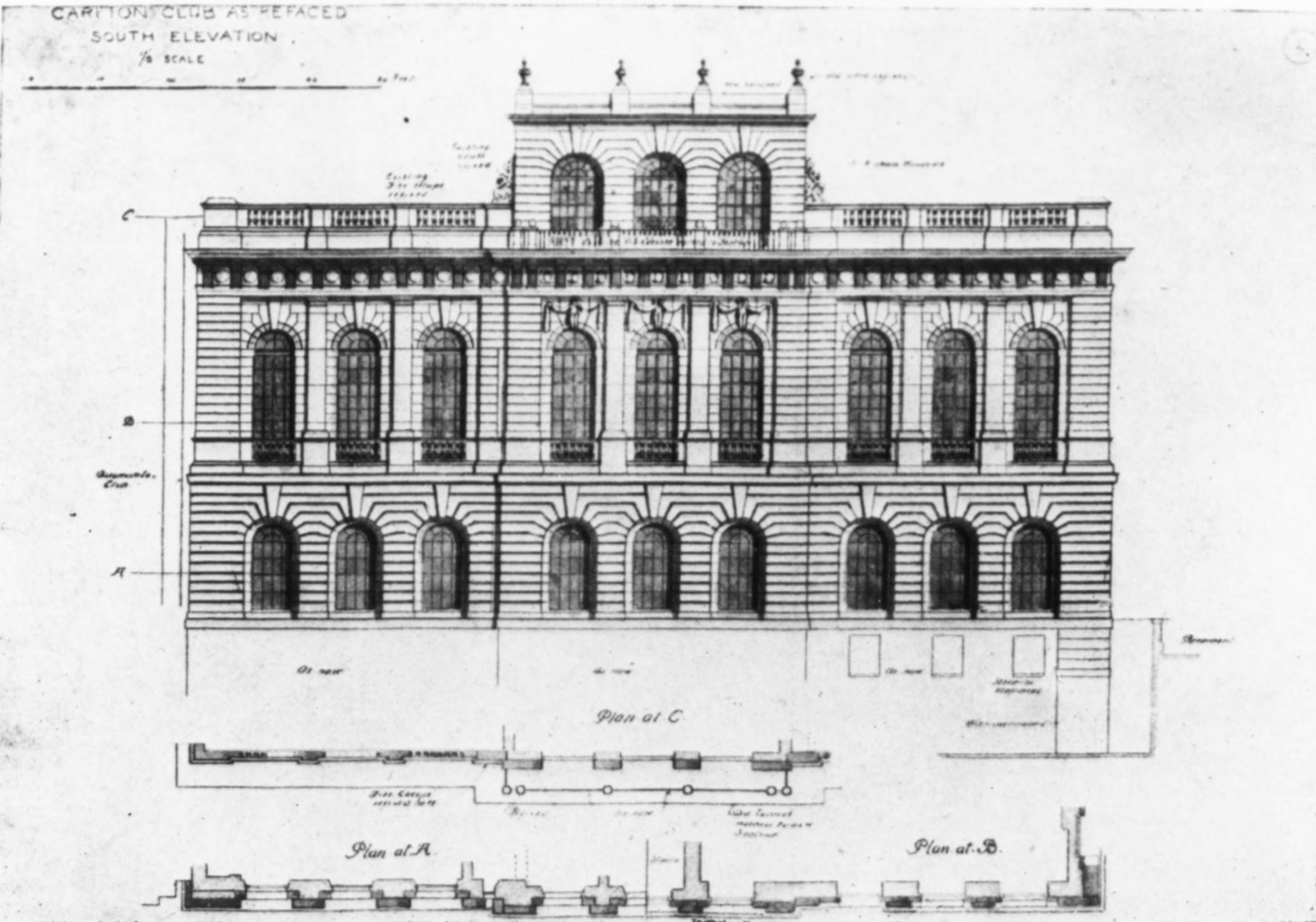
South elevation (re-facing)

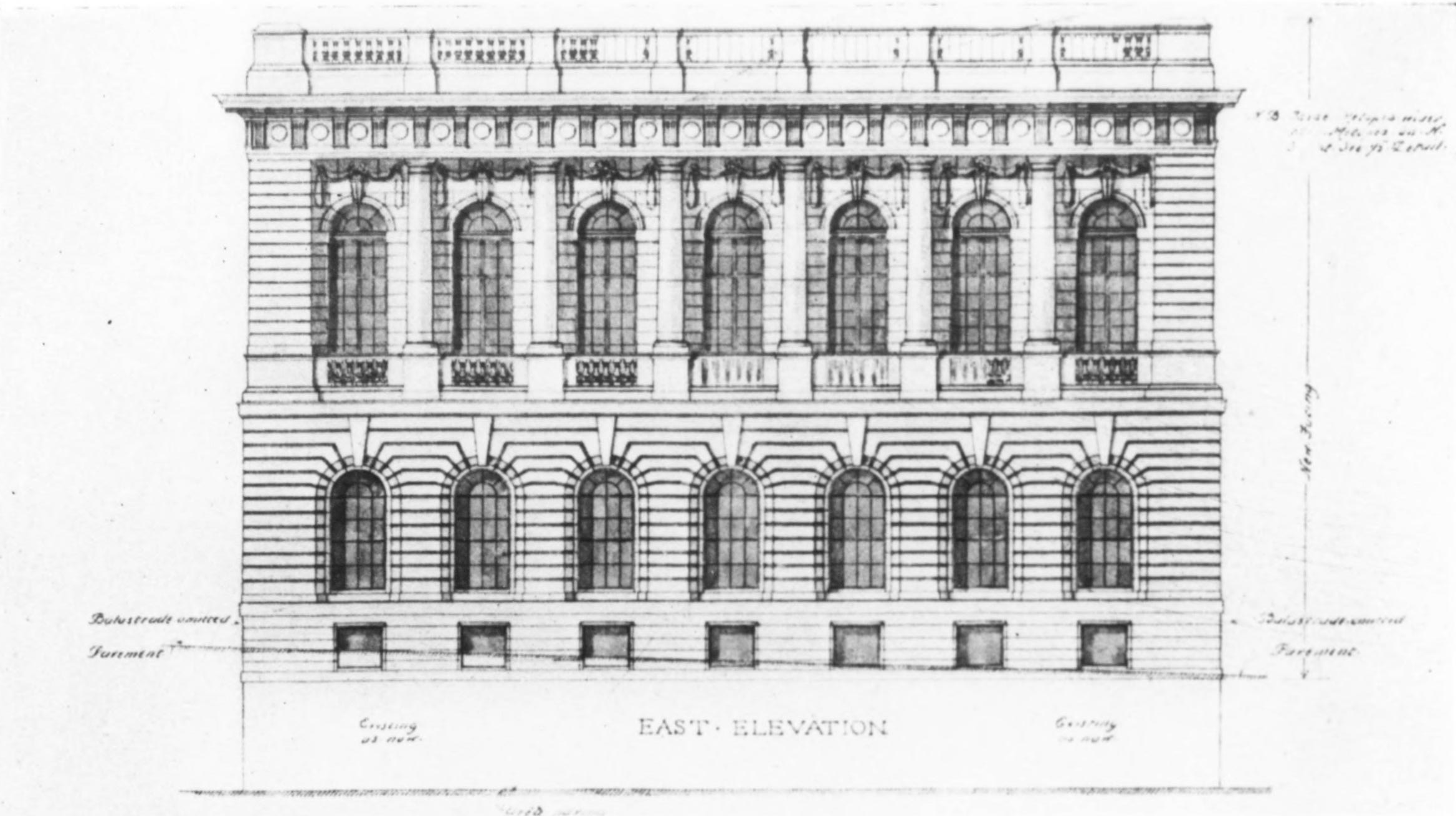
East elevation (re-facing)

== See also ==
- List of London's gentlemen's clubs
