= List of ball games =

List

This is a list of ball games and ball sports that include a ball as a key element in the activity, usually for scoring points.

== Games that include balls ==
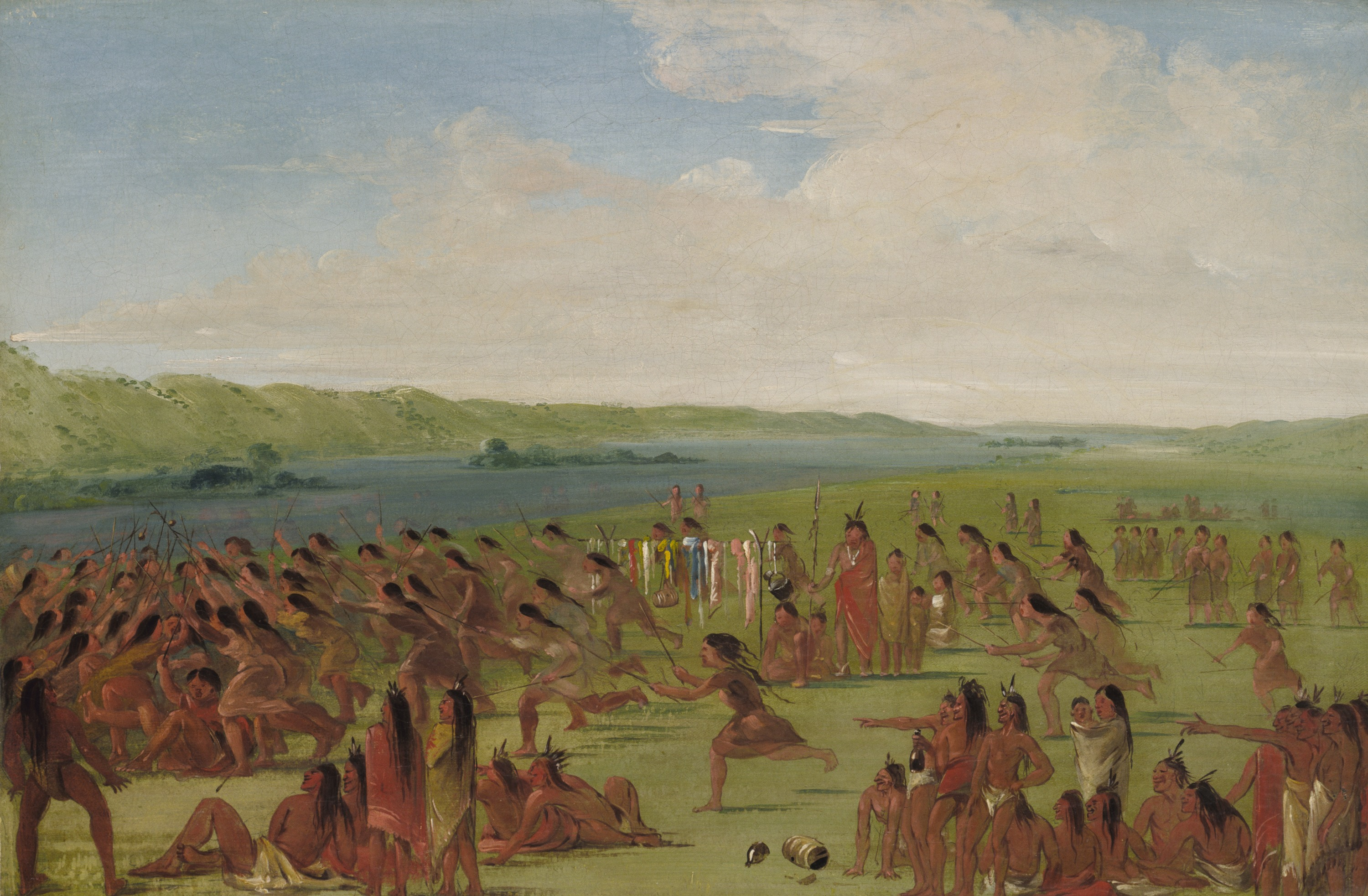
Ball-play of the Women, Prairie du Chien, oil painting by George Catlin, 1835-36

Ball sports fall within many sport categories, some sports within multiple categories, including:

- Bat-and-ball games, such as cricket and baseball.
- Invasion games, such as football and basketball.
- Net and wall games, such as volleyball.
  - Racket sports, such as tennis, table tennis, squash, and badminton (the last of which is played with a shuttlecock instead of a ball).
  - Hand and ball-striking games, such as various handball codes, rebound handball, and four square.
- Throwing sports, such as dodgeball and bocce.
- Cue sports, such as pool and snooker.
- Target sports, such as golf and bowling.

== Popular ball games ==
Games that are similar and have a common reference are grouped under the primary name such as bowling, football and hockey.

=== A–E ===
- Angleball
- Apalachee ball game
  - Crossminton
- Balonpesado
- Baseball
  - Baseball5
- Basketball
  - 3x3 (basketball)
  - Wheelchair basketball
- Basque pelota
  - Frontenis
  - Jai alai
  - Xare
- Beach tennis
- Bossaball
- Boules
  - Bocce
  - Bocce volo
  - Boccia
  - Bolas criollas
  - Bowls or "lawn bowls"
  - Jeu provençal
  - Pétanque
  - Raffa (boules)
- Bowling
  - Candlepin bowling
  - Carpet bowls
  - Duckpin bowling
  - Five-pin bowling
  - Nine-pin bowling
  - Ten-pin bowling
  - Irish road bowling
- Brännboll
- British baseball
- Broomball
- Canoe polo
- Camogie
- Cestoball
- Chinese handball
- Codeball
- Cricket (see cricket ball)
  - Backyard cricket
  - Twenty20
  - Kwik cricket
  - Vigoro
- Crossnet
- Cue sports (also knowns as billiards)
  - Carom billiards
  - English billiards
  - Pool (or pocket billiards)
  - Russian pyramid
  - Snooker
- Cycle ball
- Dodgeball
- Downball
- Dunk tank

=== F–K ===
- Fistball
- Fives
- Flag football
- Flickerball
- Football
  - Association football (soccer)
    - Futsal
    - Indoor soccer
    - Beach soccer
  - Australian rules football
  - Calcio fiorentino
  - English public school football games
  - Gaelic football
  - Gridiron football
    - American football
    - Canadian football
    - Indoor football
      - Arena football
  - Football tennis
  - International rules football
  - Medieval football games
  - Rugby football
    - Rugby league
    - Rugby union
      - Rugby sevens
    - Beach rugby
    - Underwater rugby
    - Wheelchair rugby
  - Underwater football
  - Volata
- Footvolley
- Four square
- Gaga
- Goalball
- Golf
  - GolfCross
  - Mini Golf
- Ground billiards
  - Croquet
  - Jeu de mail
  - Pall-mall
  - Roque
  - Trucco
- Half-rubber
- Handball
  - American handball
  - Australian handball
  - Beach handball
  - Field handball
  - Gaelic Handball
- Hooverball
- Hockey
  - Bandy
    - Rink bandy
      - Rinkball
  - Field hockey
    - Indoor field hockey
  - Floor hockey
    - Floorball
    - Roller hockey
      - Roller hockey (quad)
  - Street hockey
- Hocker (defunct)
- Hurling
- Jai alai
- Jokgu
- Jorkyball
- Juggling
- Kickball
- Kick-to-kick (includes end-to-end footy)
- Kin-Ball
- Klootschieten
- Knuckleball
- Korfball

=== L–P ===
- Lacrosse
  - Box Lacrosse
  - Field lacrosse
  - Intercrosse
- Lawn bowls
- Loofball
- Mesoamerican ballgame
- Netball
  - Fast5
- Newcomb ball
- Omegaball
- Padbol
- Paddle ball
- Paddle-ball
- Paddle tennis
- Padel
- Paintball
- Palin
- Patball
- Pelota mixteca
- Pesäpallo
- Picigin
- Pickleball
- Polo
  - Bicycle polo
  - Canoe polo
  - Elephant polo
  - Horseball
  - Polocrosse
  - Segway polo
  - Yak polo
- Pushball

=== Q–Z ===
- Racquetball
- Ringball
- Rock-It-Ball
- Roliball
- Rounders
- Roundnet (spikeball)
- Sepak takraw
- Shinty
- Showdown
- Sipa
- Skee ball
- Slamball
- Softball
- Squash
- Stickball
- Stickball (Native American)
- Streetball
- Table football (foosball)
- Table tennis (ping pong)
- TagPro (esports)
- Tchoukball
- Team handball
- Tee ball
- Tennis
- Tetherball
- Teqball
- Ulama
- Valencian pilota
  - Escala i corda
  - Galotxa
  - Galotxetes
  - Llargues
  - Raspall
  - Valencian fronto
- Underwater sports
- Volleyball
  - Beach volleyball
  - Sitting volleyball
  - Snow volleyball
- Waboba
- Wallball_(children's_game)
- Water basketball
- Water polo
- Welsh handball
- Wiffleball
- Wireball
