= Spaldeen =

Rubber ball

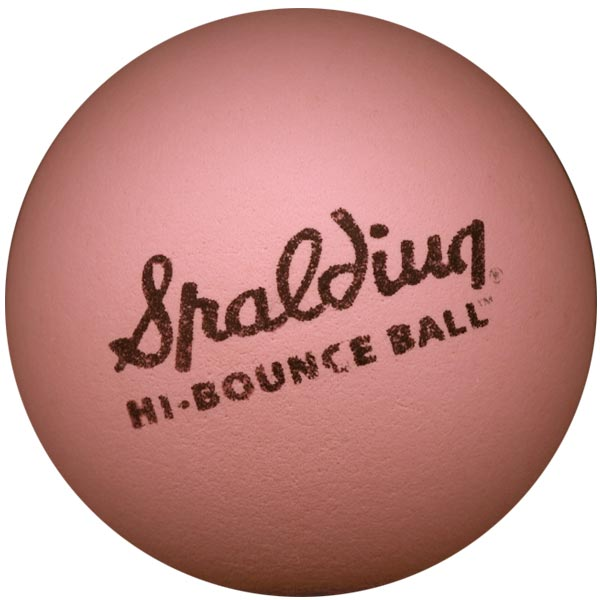
Modern-day Spaldeen

A Spalding Hi-Bounce Ball, often called a Spaldeen or a similar ball called the Pensie Pinkie, is a rubber ball, described as a tennis ball core without the felt. These balls are commonly used in street games developed in the mid-20th century, such as Chinese handball (a variation on American handball), Australian handball, stoop ball, hit-the-penny (involving trying to make a penny flip on a sidewalk), butts up, handball, punchball, boxball, half-rubber, wireball and stickball (variations of baseball).

== Name ==
The term arose from a local pronunciation of "Spalding" in Brooklyn, with Spalding being the sporting goods company that produced the balls. The name has become so common that Spalding now uses it in marketing, and it is now a registered trademark. A similar ball is the "Pensie Pinkie" or "Pennsy Pinky" referring to Penn Racquet Sports, another sporting goods manufacturer brand.

== History ==
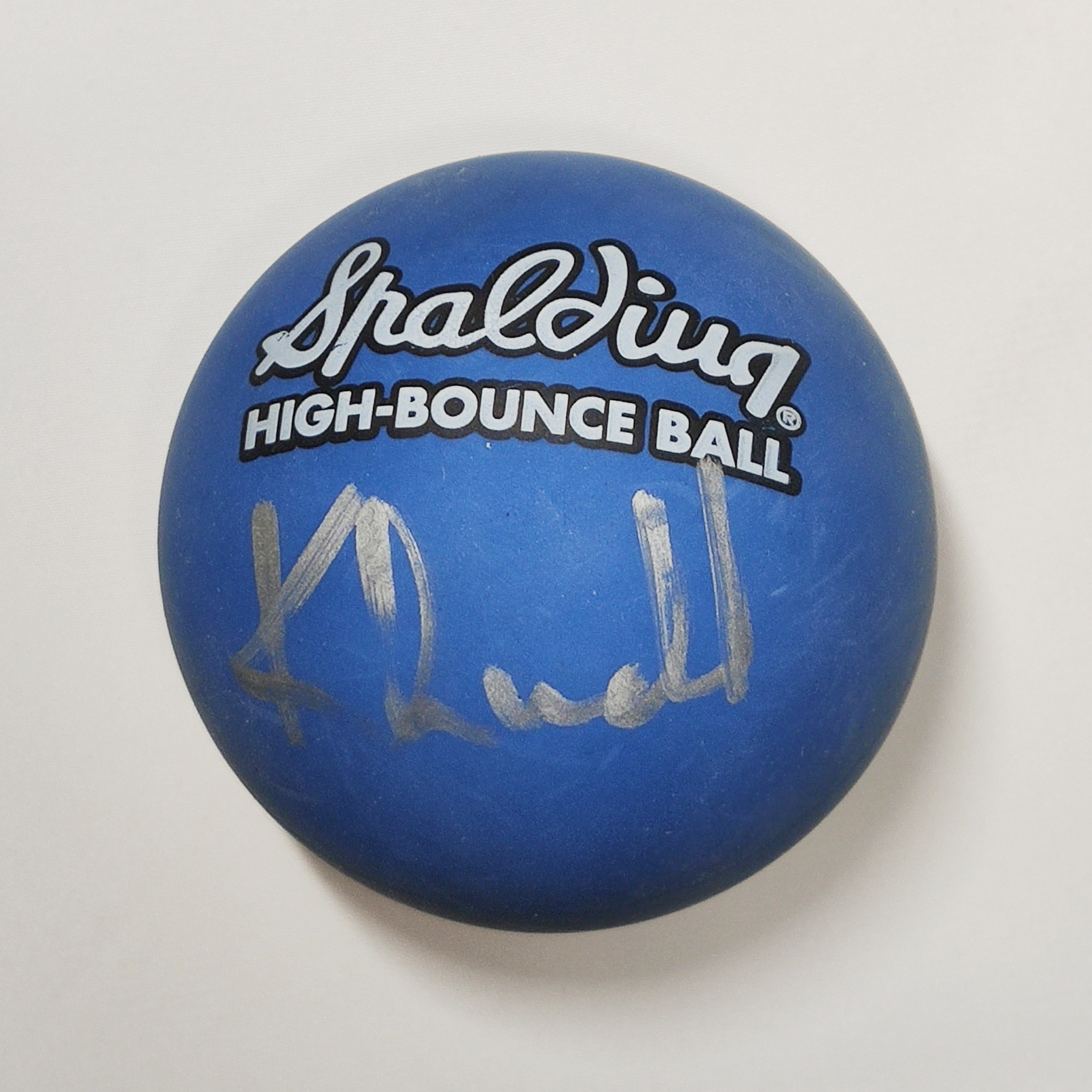
A newer Spaldeen in blue, autographed by Kevin Rudd

The original Spaldeens were tennis balls that had been rejected for slight defects. Instead of throwing them away, Spalding stamped "Spalding High-Bounce Ball" on the rubber rejects and sold them cheaply to wholesalers. They were popular with children from the 1930s through to the 1970s. The balls sold for 15 cents in the 1950s. In urban areas sparse in grass, Spaldeens became integral to many street games due to their bounciness and light weight. Players of these games at the time said of the spaldeen, if dropped from a person's eye height, it would rebound to half of their total height. Citing the declining popularity of stickball, Spalding took the ball off the market in 1979, but it returned in 1999 to much fanfare. After reintroducing spaldeens in 1999, Spalding sold more than 2 million in the first year.

In his memoir, New York Senator Chuck Schumer recalls playing slapball with spaldeens as a child growing up in Brooklyn, and refers to the baseball-inspired game and its bouncy ball as his era's video game.

== See also ==
- Bouncing ball
- Utility ball
- Bouncy ball
