= Handball (disambiguation) =

Handball is an Olympic team sport, and its variants:

- Beach handball
- Czech handball, an outdoor ball game
- Field handball, the original outdoor team handball, played at the 1936 Olympics
- Wheelchair handball

Handball may also refer to:

- Type of net and wall sports:
  - American handball
  - Australian handball
  - Chinese handball, a variant of American handball popular in New York City during the 1960s and 1970s
  - Frisian handball
  - Gaelic handball, a sport played in Ireland
  - Welsh handball
- Other contexts:
  - Handball (association football), a foul for illegal use of hands (or arms) in association football
  - Handball (Australian rules football), a legal method of disposing of the ball and an alternative to a footpass
  - Handball (schoolyard game), an Australian game played on grids of squares in schoolyards in Oceania, also known as four square and downball.
  - Handball (video game series), a video game series which simulates handball

== See also ==
- wallball
