= Wallball =

Wallball (or wall ball) is a name given to several sports that involve hitting a ball off of a wall with one's hands or feet. It may be a single or multi-player game. It may refer to:

- American handball, a North American sport played with a small rubber ball
- Butts Up, a North American schoolyard game
- One-wall handball, also known as International fronton, is a code of both American handball and Gaelic handball
- Patball, a United Kingdom sport played with a tennis ball hit against a wall
- Suicide (game), a game where players throw a rubber ball at a wall, and at opponents
- Wallball (children's game), a North American schoolyard game similar to squash
- Chinese handball, a 20th century North American street game

== See also ==
- Basque pelota, a European game played similarly to those above
- Wallyball, a game similar to volleyball, where the ball can be bounced off of walls
- Welsh handball, a similar wall game played in Wales
