= Pinners =

Ball game

- Players: 2 or more
- Setup time: None
- Playing time: No limit
- Chance: Low
- Age range: 7 and up
- Skills: Running, catching, throwing

Pinners is a Chicago neighborhood game played on the front stoop, or on walls with angled bricks or stones which can be used to pop the ball up in the air. References and accounts of the game exist to 1949 or earlier.

== Play ==
The batter throws a rubber ball or tennis ball at the edge of the step or angled wall brick, and the fielder (or fielders) try to catch it as it bounces back. The game is played with a 2.5-inch (64 mm) hollow pink soft rubber ball called a "Pinky" that bounces well from the edges of steps. Baseball gloves are not allowed.

The scoring rules are similar to baseball, but with runs being virtual and determined by where the ball lands. A single, double, triple or home run depends upon predetermined landmarks (i.e. sidewalk, trees, cars, street, curb lines) from the batting area. A catch is an out, and a one-handed catch is called a "rushie".

As with most neighborhood games, rules varied by the groups playing and house rules are determined at the start of the game, including the base locations. The game utilizes traditional Chicago neighborhood row house architecture, with most houses (Chicago Bungalow style) having front stairs or a stoop that leads from the front door to the sidewalk. Many of the schools built in Chicago have a horizontal perfectly angled section of decorative brick, at the right height, that can be used for the game.

The batter's box painted on building or school walls with an X marking was used for "Fast Pitch", another local school-yard game.

== Name variants ==
- Some North Siders referred to the game as Ledge.
- In 1949 at Fiske Elementary, it was called (pronounced) Penner, without the plural s.
- In the area near South Shore High School, the game was known as Pinnard or Pinnerd in the 1960s.
- Bounce Out
- 3 Outs

== Terminology ==
Double Play
A play in which the fielder catches the ball creating an out, the fielder may throw or lob the ball so that it bounces once on a step that is parallel to the ground. The fielder may move to catch the ball after the throw. The fielder who did not catch the ball for the original out may move before the ball has been thrown in order to catch the ball for another out. The throw to the step may hit the part of the step that is parallel to ground once, but may hit a part of the step that is perpendicular to the ground as well. The ball, however, is a dead-ball when thrown and it bounces off a backstop before being caught again.
Rush Hour
A play in which the ball is out of play, either by foul ball, home run, or a misplay by the fielder, the fielder must throw the ball to the batter from where he stands or the batter may call stalling if the fielder is walking before he has thrown it in.
Rushies
A one-handed catch, leading to an automatic three outs. The player catching the ball with one hand is allowed to run towards the batter's box and throw the ball while the opposing team is in transition from offense to defense.
Stalling
When called the batting team is awarded a single without the batter, who would be up, having to sacrifice their turn in the order.

== See also ==
- Stoop ball
- Wallball (disambiguation)
