= Patball =

Competitive ball sport

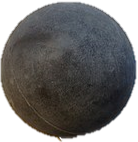
- A black patball
- Nicknames: "Pattball", "Downball", "Wallball", "Slapball"

Characteristics
- Contact: Limited to none
- Team members: One person per team, each team competes against the others
- Mixed-sex: yes
- Type: Competing sport, ball sport
- Equipment: Wall/court, hand, tennis ball/patball
- Venue: School playground, patball court

Patball is a non-contact competitive ball game played in many forms using one's hands or head to hit the ball against a wall – the objective being to get the succeeding player out. The game is popular in school playgrounds during break-time. Patball is played with a tennis ball, or other similar-sized specific patball, and the preferred hand, rather than any form of racquet or bat, similar to wallball. The objective is for players to hit a ball so that it bounces on the ground before rebounding off the wall. The hand is used to "pat" the ball at the wall or at the opponent with the objective of making the ball un-returnable, similar to squash. Variations of the game include the use of the foot -'footies' or 'Devils' touch', a semi-contact rule popularised at Coopers Technology College.

It is popular among London public schools, most notably, private schools such as Whitgift School, St John's Beaumont School, Dulwich College, and Woodcote.

The game is also played extensively across London state schools. In 1992, Highgate Wood Secondary School in Haringey installed special patball walls made from plywood in order to satisfy the popularity of the game. St John's Beaumont School has patball courts painted on a playground wall.

== Game ==
Patball, in most forms, is played by two opposing players, but multiple players at once are possible depending on space restrictions. It is played against walls of a various widths, with the exact areas usually agreed upon based on age, space availability and a size which will allow continuous play rather than repeated restarts or "second serves".

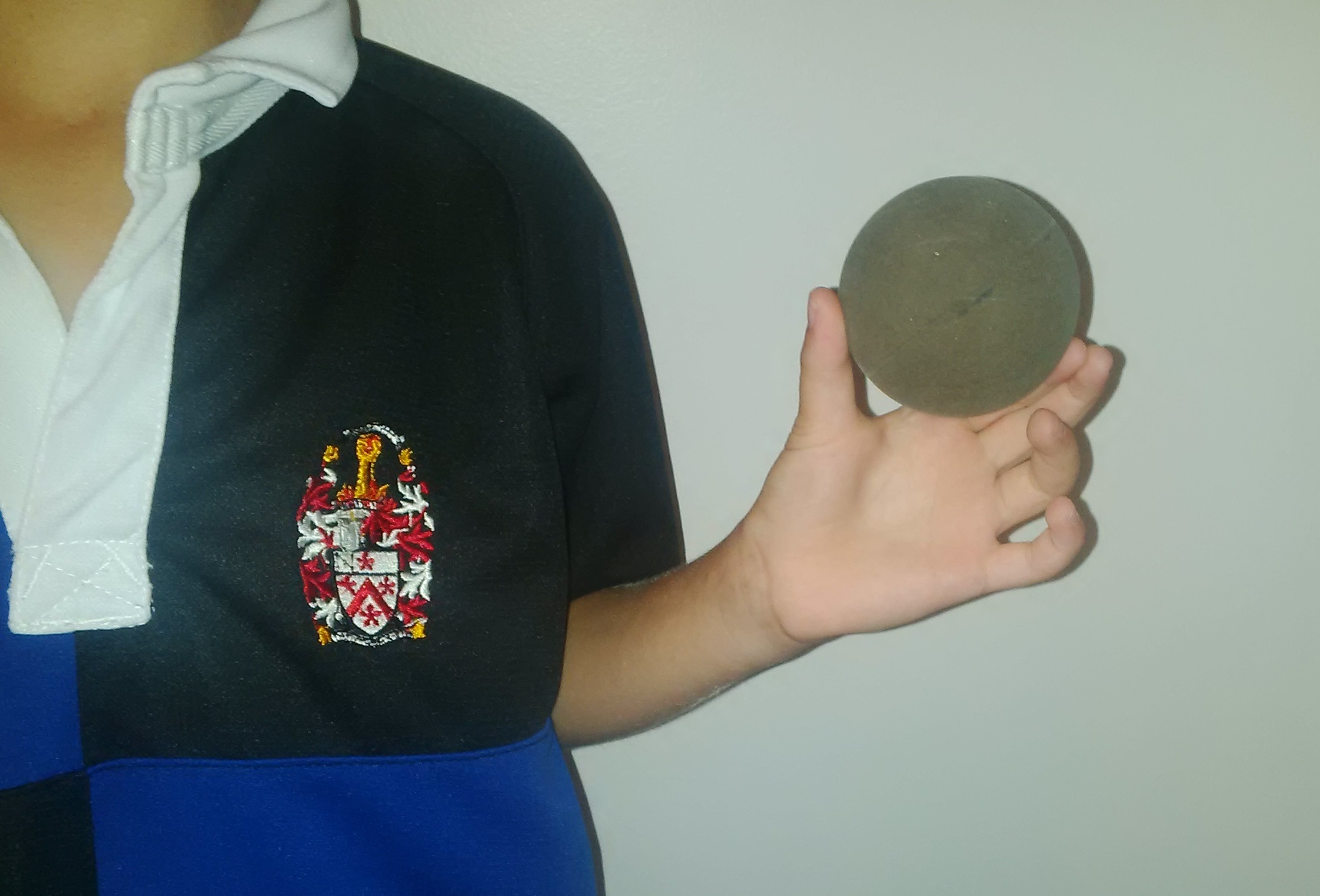
Patball ball being held by Dulwich College student

Only the players' hands may hit the ball and different shots and skills are employed to avoid the opponent being able to return the shot, at which point the opposing player is out or loses a life depending on the game version being played.

The ball used is usually a standard tennis ball, but Dulwich College uses a specific patball. This is a hollow rubber ball purchased from the school commissariat which can best be described as a tennis ball without the fibrous felt.

Recently, new variants of patball have been invented such as 'Aces', 'Kingpin' and 'Single Dingles'. Aces is played with four players on a special court (eight equally sized squares painted on the ground) and each player uses one square. It is played just as the original version, except for the fact that the wall is on the opponent's court and "lives" are used, varying on who is playing. When a player runs short of lives, he/she becomes a "ghost", who is still allowed to play but cannot lose lives or make players still in the game lose lives. When just two players remain, each player gets four of the eight squares each and continues with the number of lives that they had prior to this. The players continue playing until one of the two is knocked out.

Kingpin consists of three to eight players. Much like aces the players play on the ground but once they lose the point they go to the back and the aim is to become the king, who starts the rally every point. The positions are in order: King, Queen, 1st Jock / Bishop, 2nd Jock / Bishop, 3rd Jock / Bishop, 4th Jock / Bishop, 5th Jock / Bishop and 6th Jock / Bishop. The game ends when the end of break/lunch bell goes. Up to twelve players could play (King, Queen, Jack and playing cards from 10 down) with 9 being a common court configuration (King in the middle). The king bounces the ball in his square and onto someone else's. If the ball double bounced, was missed or went out of court, the player would be out and demoted to the bottom square.

Single Dingles is played like Kingpin but with two people and the one winner stays on.

== Rules ==
The rules of patball will vary slightly across different areas, but these are the generally accepted rules for a standard game.

=== General gameplay ===
1. Two players or more can play at any one time. An order is decided for the players, where – in chronological order – the succeeding player will attempt to shoot.
2. The first player serves by throwing the ball to the floor near the wall, making it bounce and hit the wall.
3. The second player lets the ball bounce once after hitting the wall, before hitting it to the floor again so it bounces onto the wall and back to the next player.
4. This continues until one player misses the ball and fails to return it to the other player or hits the wall directly without letting the ball bounce (produces a "direct"). The player that failed to hit it back is out and a new "half-round" begins with the players that are not yet out (if the game consists of more than two players).
5. When the final two players (if there were other players as well) are left, they compete in rounds where the winner is declared out of two points. In some instances, the final round does not have to go through the "out-of-two" phase. Instead, the final players can decide the winner out of one point.
6. If the players decide to start a completely new round, the order is based on the players that were out first being last, e.g. if there were five players competing, the first player to get out would be fifth in the order.
7. In some variations aces will be allowed and in this instance, a serve which is un-returnable will result in an automatic elimination for the receiver.

=== Event rules ===
When the ball hits an object or a person before the returning player has a chance to hit it, "obs" is declared. If a consensus is reached in that it was "obs", the round is restarted with the player that declared "obs" serving. The game-play and rules are often changed by the players. For example, some players would not allow the shooting technique of hitting the ball onto the wall without a bounce, but others could eliminate that rule so that the shooting player can hit the ball right before the bounce occurs. In any instance where the ball goes in a wild direction due to an odd surface, named "curbs" or a "dodgy bounce", a re-throw takes place. If the second player dislikes the first player's serve, they can declare a "second serve", and the first player has to re-serve. The first player can declare a "second serve" as well if they wish to. This can be thought to be useful to the first player because the first player cannot get out on the first serve.

=== Point-scoring patball ===
Patball is sometimes played with a point scoring system where the winner of each round gets a point and the person with the most points at the end is victorious, e.g. the players go through a specific number of rounds, e.g. out of ten. The players have to keep track of their points. This is often known in Dulwich College as "Aces".

== Language ==
Patball uses a jargon language within the game, with a fairly large number of terms and usages. These jargon languages occur in many sports but patball's jargon is notable and commonplace.

The main terms, which vary across different areas of the game, are in the following glossary:

Term	Meaning
Obs	A derivation of 'obstruction'. When the ball hits an object or a person that blocks it before the returning player has a chance to hit it. The most common kind of this is "bag obs" or "bobs" in which the ball hits bags acting as posts and therefore cannot reach the wall.
Mids/Crease (original version only) / BC (new versions)	The ball hitting exactly between the wall and the ground. The person who calls it remains in the game.
Lines/Post (newer versions only)	The ball hitting the line exactly between two opposing courts. In dingles the person who calls it serves next round.
Drag / Carry	When a player scoops the ball up instead of patting it, and the player is then out. In many variations, however, the scooping up of the ball and the rolling of it off the hand can be seen.
Straight-ins	When a player hits the ball before letting it bounce onto the floor. This shot is not allowed, and the player producing the shot is out.
Double Bounce Scoop-ups	When a player allows the ball to bounce twice before hitting it. This shot is normally allowed in games where players are less experienced, but in any other cases the person producing the Double Bounce is out.
Triple Bounce Kick-ups	Similar to Double Bounce Scoop-Ups but only with the ball bouncing thrice before a kick.
Blind	When a player blocks sight of the ball, so another misses the pat.
Direct/ straight ends	When a player hits the ball onto the wall, or into another players court, without letting it bounce, in their court first. The player is then out.
Rolls	When, after the ball hits the wall, it rolls across the floor. The point is then replayed.
Second Serve / Re-serves	When the first serve is considered ineligible for whatever reason, the ball is "re-served".
Finals	When the Second Serve/re-serve is considered ineligible, the ball can be served for a final time. If the ball is to be considered ineligible during the final serve, the person who served is out.
Odd Bounce/ Curbs/ dodgies	When, after the ball hits the ground, it bounces in an unpredictable way. If called before the ball is played, the point is replayed unless obvious intentional spin was put on the ball. In some versions it is not replayed.
Self-obs / Spike/ body bits	The ball hitting the returning player before they can hit it back themselves. OR: The ball hitting the player who made the pat before hitting the wall. If this occurs, the player is out.
Killer / Don't want / Bad serve / Dick Serve	A serve that can not be returned and a "Second Serve" is appointed.
Conditional	As the name suggests, when an unforeseen event occurs and neither player is at fault, that point is replayed.
Demon	A player who is out but stands in front of the wall and can catch the ball on any shot except a serve. If the ball is caught, the demon may replace the player who hit the shot. If the ball hits the wall before being caught the catch does not count and the demon is given one "obs". If the ball hits the demon without them catching it, this is also considered an "obs". If the demon obstructs the ball twice they are no longer allowed near the wall, in which case they are out. A demon does not move from his chosen position on the wall, although this depends on the game. Demons are not generally used in games and will vary in number depending on wall size. The term 'demon' is used to mean someone who has come back to haunt the other remaining players.
Side-demon	Similar to a demon, a side demon is a player who is out and may stand to the side of the wall and catch the ball. The same rules apply to the side-demon as the demon. Side-demons are normally used on smaller walls where there is less space.
Mountains	When the ball is thrown to the ground to bounce higher than usual or to the back courts in 'king pin'.
Low-cut / Below-Knees	When the ball is hit and bounces below one's knees, usually winning the point.
Tips	When the ball is played with the tips of the fingers. This is a controversial foul call, the legitimacy of which is in constant debate.
Purpose Obs	When a player tries to intentionally simulate the act of being 'obsed' by another person, in which case they are out.
Stealies	When a player purposely hits the ball off the oppositions court it is not bouncing on their own court.
Savies	When a player purposely saves a player by hitting the ball off the oppositions court.
Copy	Where a player plays the ball through his or her legs, or any other distinguishable move subsequently calling "copy". The proceeding players then have to copy the action. If a copy is called and the player calling the copy does a standard hit, then that player is out.
Devils' Touch	If activated prior to a round of play then it is possible to knock out any player by hitting the ball at them instead of the wall. If such an attempt is successfully dodged the 'hitter' goes out. If the shot hits a player then that player is out and a new round is begun.
Holidays	When extra players can join a full match of kingpin by using a queue behind the last square. If holidays are legal the player who has been knocked out is required to go to 'holidays', when the player is knocked out the first in queue for holidays moves up to the last court.

== See also ==
- Chinese_handball
- Downball
- Wallball

== Sources ==
- Patball at Streetgames.co.uk
