= Recess (break) =

Period in which a group of people are temporarily dismissed from their duties

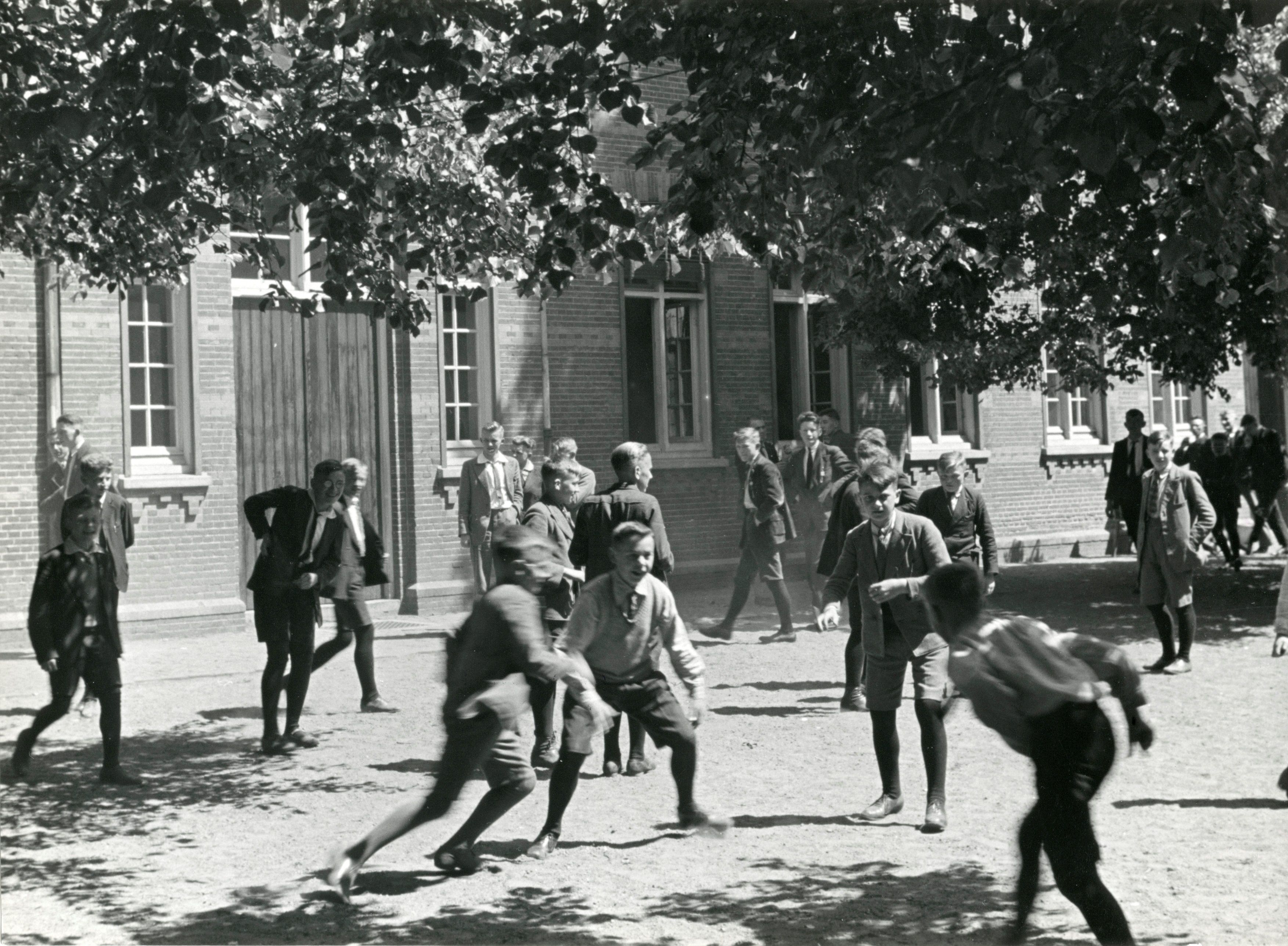
Netherlands, 1934

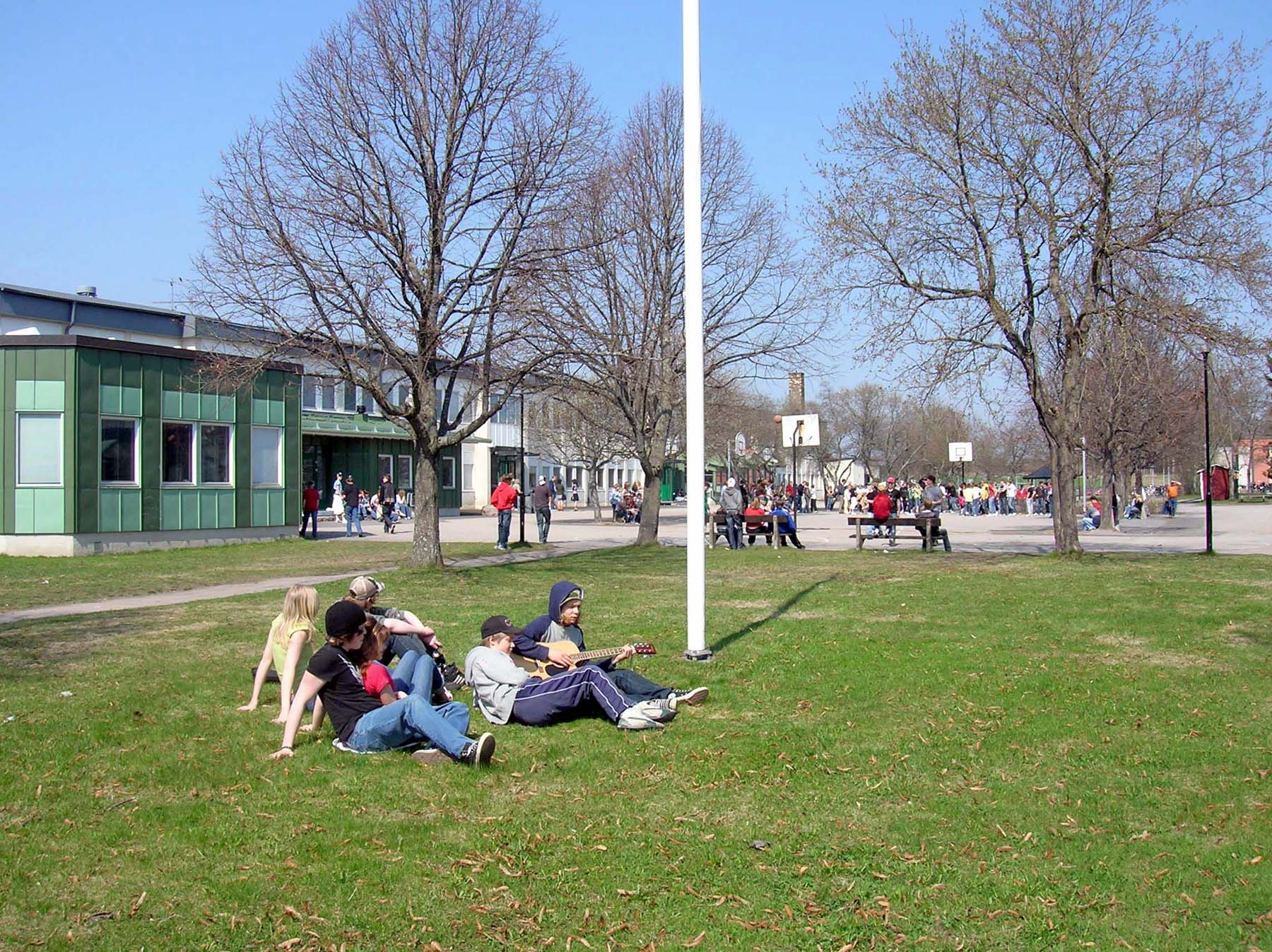
Sweden, 2006

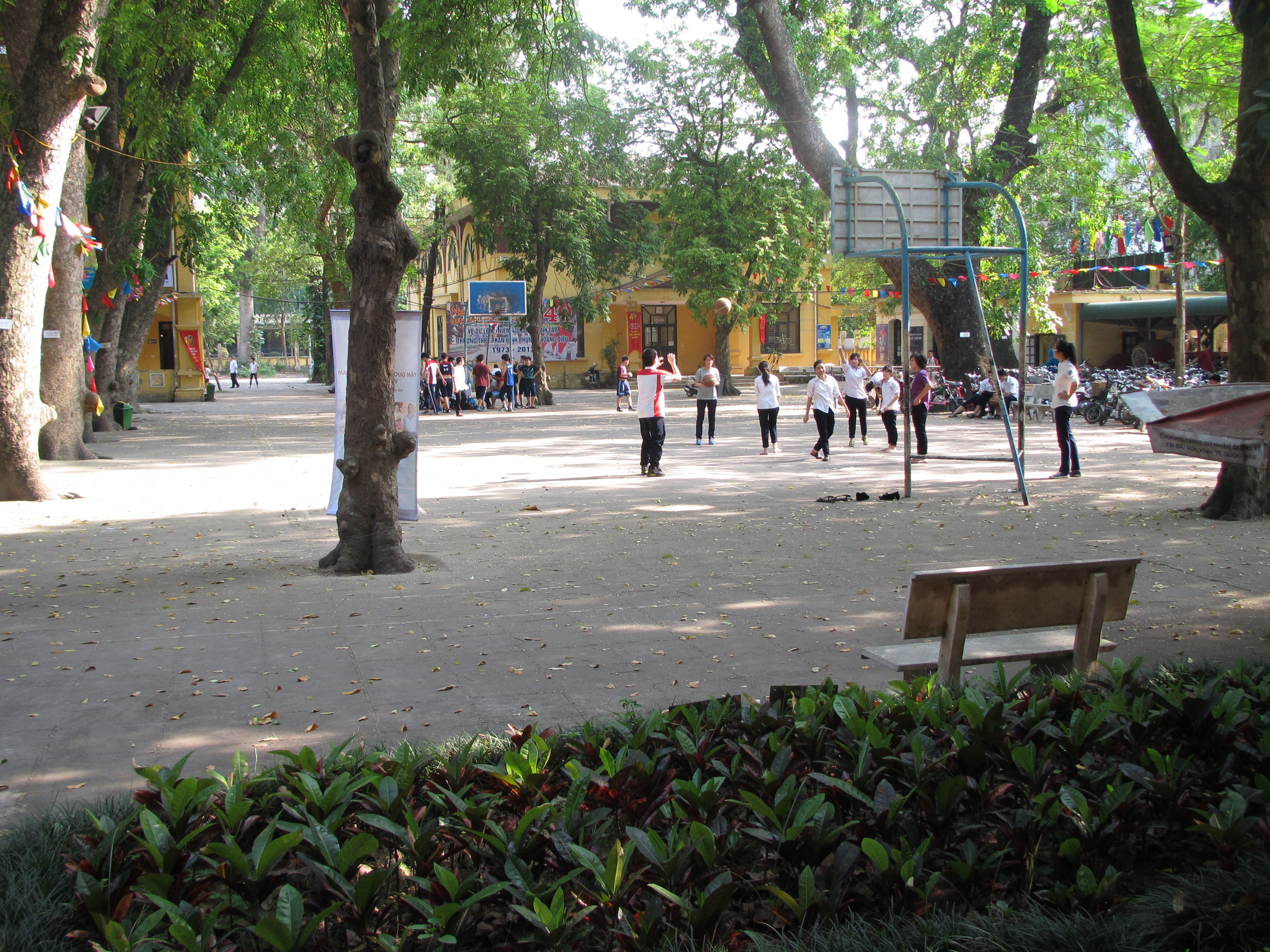
Vietnam, 2014

Recess is a general term for a period in which a group of people are temporarily dismissed from their duties.

In education, recess is the American and Australian term (known as break or playtime in the UK), where students have a mid-morning snack and play before having lunch after a few more lessons. Recess could occur during other times of the school day, such as after lunch or before dismissal. Typically ten to thirty minutes, in elementary school where students are allowed to leave the school's interior to enter its adjacent outside park where they play on equipment such as slides and swings, play basketball, tetherball, study, make up any missing assignments or talk. Many middle and high schools also offer a recess to provide students with a sufficient opportunity to consume quick snacks, communicate with their peers, visit the restroom, study, and various other activities.

== Importance of play in child development ==
During recess, children play, and learning through play has been long known as a vital aspect of childhood development. Some of the earliest studies of play began with G. Stanley Hall, in the 1890s. These studies sparked an interest in the developmental, mental and behavioral tendencies of babies and children. Current research emphasizes recess as a place for children to "role-play essential social skills" and as an important time in the academic day that "counterbalances the sedentary life at school." Play has also been associated with the healthy development of parent-child bonds, establishing social, emotional and cognitive developmental achievements that assist them in relating with others, and managing stress.

Although no formal education exists during recess, sociologists and psychologists consider recess an integral portion of child development, to teach them the importance of social skills and physical education. Play is essential for children to develop not only their physical abilities, but also their intellectual, social, and moral capabilities. Via play, children can learn about the world around them. Some of the known benefits of recess are that students are more on task during academic activities, have improved memory, are more focused, develop a greater number of neural connections, and that it leads to more physical activity outside of the school setting.

Psychomotor learning also gives children clues on how the world around them works as they can physically demonstrate such skills. Children need the freedom to play to learn skills necessary to become competent adults such as coping with stress and problem solving. Through the means of caregiver's observations of children's play, one can identify deficiencies in children's development. While there are many types of play children engage in that all contribute to development, it has been emphasized that free, spontaneous play—the kind that occurs on playgrounds—is the most beneficial type of play.

Recess is key in the development of children. Studies have shown that recess plays a large role in how children develop their social skills. During recess, children usually play games involving teamwork. On the playground, children use many leadership skills – they educate other children about games to play, take turns, and learn to resolve conflicts while playing these games. The leadership skills promoted throughout recess are how children are able to continue to play the games. Along with developing social skills, recess helps with the development of children's brains. Recess gives the children's brains a chance to "regroup" after a long day of class, restoring and enriching their ability to pay attention.

The physical activity leads to the development of the brain. Brain research has shown a relationship between physical activity and the development of the human brain. Another study supports these findings from the brain research. A school system that dedicated one third of their school day to nonacademic activities – such as recess and physical education – led to improved attitudes and fitness, and improved test scores despite spending less time in the classroom.

=== Social development ===
Problem solving is an integral part in child development and free play allows for children to learn to problem solve on their own. Teachers and caregivers can scaffold problem solving through modeling or assisting when a confrontation occurs. Although play should involve adults, adults or caregivers should not control the play because when adults control the play, the children can lose their creativity, leadership, and group skills. Adults should let children create and follow agreed upon rules and only intervene if a serious conflict arises. Problem solving encourages children to compromise and cooperate with each other.

The conflict resolution process helps children to attain a vast range of social and emotional skills such as empathy, flexibility, self-awareness, and self-regulation. This vast range or capabilities is often referred to as "emotional intelligence" and is essential to building and maintaining relationships in adult life. Teachers can also view recess as a time to observe children's social and cognitive development skills and be able to develop different activities in the classroom that reflect the children's interests and development.

Recess at its core is a social experience for children and plays a significant part in the development of language. Children's intentionality with language during recess is tied closely to navigating the social landscape of the playground. Even as early as preschool, children use language to make group decisions and establish authority or a standing in the social setting of the playground. One researcher states that children use language to "invoke play ideas as their own possessions to manage and control the unfolding play", which engages a bidding war for group leadership. When viewing recess through a language perspective, the individual experience of the playground can vary depending on a willingness to follow other's ideas, and the development of language to modify play as it unfolds.

== Indoor recess ==
Depending on the weather (rain, large amounts of snow, and sometimes in extreme heat or extreme cold), recess might be held indoors. Therefore, it should include creative activities that promote movement of moderate-to-vigorous intensity, whether in a gym or a classroom. Allowing the students to finish work, play any board games or other activities that take more than one to play. This helps to encourage group activity, and some games are also educational.

They might play educational computer games or read books. It may contribute to do something non-educational, to help unwind and de-stress from the daily workload. Sometimes, some classes might watch a film or a TV program.

== Recess data ==
The debate surrounding recess has been around for decades and is still happening today. Some people believe that recess is important, while others argue that eliminating recess will lead to better academic achievement. Educators, parents, and experts are debating the importance of recess and play time in the school day. Data shows that recess has many benefits for students. These benefits include increased health, increased test scores, increased attention and social abilities, and better behavior. This is because during this physical activity, students produce dopamine, a neurotransmitter involved in memory and problem-solving.

In the US, the National Association for the Education of Young Children (NAEYC) advocates for unstructured play, including recess. NAEYC recommends play as a way for children to decrease stress and develop socially. But, about 40% of school districts in the United States are doing away with recess. Studies show that this lack of free and unstructured play during recess may contribute to the rise in childhood obesity, anxiety and depression among children, as well as attention deficit hyperactivity disorder.

=== Childhood obesity and type 2 diabetes ===
Childhood obesity and type 2 diabetes are also a major concern as United States youth do not get the physical outlet needed not only for their cognitive development but for their physical health. Statistics show that children are getting 50% less physical exploration and activity than decades before. Research has shown that spending 60 minutes a day doing physical activity can prevent childhood obesity.

The U.S. Health and Human Services department has a guideline for 60 minutes a day of physical activity. Research has shown that only very few children actually meet this national guideline. Failure to meet this guideline and exercise daily is leading to harmful health issues for children. Recess can be an outlet for students to get some of this physical activity and aid in preventing childhood obesity and diabetes.

=== Timing of recess ===
Another important aspect of recess to consider is what time of day it should be implemented. Traditionally schools have recess after lunch. But, in 2002, the Recess before Lunch (RBL) movement was founded. A health team in Montana created a study on four schools that made this schedule adjustment. After this study, many schools have started adapting the recess before lunch schedule. Research suggests that having recess before lunch can improve the nutrition and behavior of elementary students.

=== Effects on classroom behavior ===
A 2010 study found a link between physical activity and academic performance. Some benefits to recess include students being more attentive, better academic performance and better behavior. Many different studies show recess as being beneficial to students in the classroom. One of the goals of recess is to help students release excess energy and be refreshed focused upon return to the classroom. In a 2009 study, children who received daily recess were reported to behave better within the classroom.

After a long time in the classroom, students may become restless and disengaged. Studies show that after recess students become more attentive and engaged in classroom discussions. This is because recess gave students a necessary break from the rigorous classroom and learning setting. A 2017 study of fifth graders suggested that 25 minutes of recess could increase students' time on task. Also, recess can reduce the risk of students falling asleep during learning time by its physical aspect allows students' bodies to oxygenate and stay awake.

=== COVID-19 studies ===
Studies have been done on the effects of the COVID-19 pandemic and the resulting lack of structured recess time for children. School closures meant that children did not have access to school-provided recess periods and the physical restrictions and isolation of that period limited more unstructured forms of recess. Pandemic-related social restrictions reduced children's opportunities for the physical activity and socialization with peers usually associated with recess. Research also notes negative emotional effects of the lack of structured recess on children of all ages, with more pronounced effects seen in adolescent children.

== Restriction of recess as disciplinary action ==
In many schools around the country recess is taken away from students as disciplinary action. In 2013, researchers from the University of Chicago Illinois found that 68 percent of school districts had no policy or law prohibiting educators from taking away physical activity from students. Because of this, many educators and administrators take away recess as a punishment. A 2009 Gallup poll revealed that 77 percent of principals say that they have taken away recess from students.

Oftentimes students serve punishments such as completing late work or talking to the principal regarding behavioral issues during their recess times. However, by taking away recess, students are unable to release any excess energy that they may have. Releasing this excess energy can lead to better behavior and academic performance.

Although taking away recess as disciplinary action seems to be the decision in many schools, researchers are coming up with alternatives for the elimination of recess. Some of these alternatives include positive reinforcement which rewards children for positive behavior rather than taking away things for negative behavior. In this situation, every child is guaranteed recess.

== International recess ==
In the United Kingdom and Ireland, high school (11–16 or 18) students traditionally do not have "free periods" but do have "break" which normally occurs just after their second lesson of the day, normally referred to as second period. This generally lasts for around 20 minutes. During the break, snacks are sometimes sold in the canteen (U.S. cafeteria) and students normally use this time to socialize or finish off any homework or schoolwork that needs to be completed.

Once the break is finished, students go to their next class. Lunchtime commences one or two lessons later and usually lasts around 45–60 minutes. This system is more or less the same in junior schools (7–11) in the UK and Ireland and in high schools (14–18) in the U.S.. Infant schools (4 or 5–7) normally add another break time towards the end of the day.

In Australia and New Zealand, a mid-morning recess is taken for morning tea. Colloquial terms for this break include little lunch, prevalent in the Australian state of Queensland, or play-lunch, common in Victoria, and "recess" at a secondary school level. In Canada, the break is referred to as "lunch-break", "recess", or play-lunch. In all three countries, it is followed by mid-morning classes, after which a more lengthy meal break, lunch or lunchtime, is taken. Thus, the structure of the school-day consists of three lesson blocks, broken up by two intervals: recess (morning tea) and lunch respectively.

The average school day in Japan is eight hours. The time in the classroom is no different compared to the U.S., with time spent out of the classroom is what makes the day longer. A quarter of the day is spent in non-academic activities. A typical day contains a long enough lunch break to go home and eat with their family. This gives the students time to soak in their morning lesson and prepare for the afternoon session. Students who do not go home read for their pleasure or interact with other students. When the school day is over the majority of the students stay after school for clubs and other activities. The benefits of having a longer break and several non-academic clubs after school is that the students interact with one another and tend to have fewer physical symptoms related to stress, and better relationships with their classmates.

Some schools in Beijing, China allow children to spend an hour or two to socialize or to step out of the classroom per day. Some schools do not have a dedicated recess period, instead allowing a ten-minute break per class session. For lunch, students either pack or buy from the school's lunch area. After lunch time there is a quiet period. During this period, children may read at their desks or play by themselves. Meanwhile, a few students are chosen to help clean up from lunch, which may be perceived as a coveted assignment. Schools implementing a no-recess policy may not even have a playground, while schools allowing recess may have multiple playgrounds or basketball courts.

Finnish students rank near the top in terms of academic testing and knowledge. Their students receive over an hour of recess every day, regardless of the weather. In Finland schools consider recess to be an essential part of the school day, and this element of their curriculum is attracting international attention.

In Spain, all primary, middle and high schools allow a recess time for its students.

In Wales, pupils are expected to do only one hour of PE per fourteen days.

=== United States ===
In the United States, recess policies are largely dependent on the school district, and vary from state to state and from school to school. Most states do not have a recess policy. It is recommended that schools provide 150 minutes per week for physical activity in elementary schools and 225 minutes per week in middle and high school. In practice, schools in the United States increasingly view recess as an optional period and try to replace recess with physical education classes.

The point where recess ends in a child's education is largely dependent on the school district. By many standards, it is removed when the child enters middle school. In college, students usually have free periods, which are similar in spirit.

=== Common recess activities ===
Recess is a common part of the school day for children around the world, but it has not received much attention from scholars. The research that has been conducted occurred mostly in the United States and the UK. In 2012, of the fifty states in the United States, only fifteen had policies that recommend or require daily recess or a physical activity break, and one (Oklahoma) has no policy, but it is recommended by the State Board of Education.

Certain activities have emerged as playground favorites, including: jump rope, Chinese jump rope, four square, hop scotch, basketball, soccer, hula hoops, chase, wall ball, and playing on the playground equipment. These activities have been classified into chase games, ball games, and jumping/verbal games. Other categories to consider would be general play and equipment related play.

- Chase games: tag, chase, hide and go seek
- Ball games: four square, basketball, wall ball, soccer, kick ball
- Jumping/verbal games: jump rope, Chinese jump rope, hop scotch, hula hoops, chanting/clapping/rhyming games, Duck Duck Goose
- General play: make believe or fantasy play, solitary play
- Equipment related play: swings, slides, climbing, monkey bars, tetherball

Games and play both occur on playgrounds, so it is important to differentiate between the two when discussing activities in which children engage at recess. One way to view their uniqueness is to look at the function of their rules. Games, such as basketball, have concrete rules that result in penalties when broken. Play rules are flexible and can change at the discretion of the players. There are times though when kids will bend the concrete rules of some games to make new versions of these games that may or may not be remembered in future times of play.

Recess activities run the gamut from simple to complex. Children's gender and age affects their recess recreation choices. The youngest children in elementary schools, kindergarten to second grade, prefer the simplest activities such as chase, kickball, jump rope, and unstructured games. As the school year progresses, it has been observed that chase games diminish and ball games increase. By the time children are in upper elementary school, grades three to five, they prefer sports and social sedentary behavior like talking.
