= WorcesterScene =

American tourist website

- Company type: Private
- Industry: Hospitality
- Founded: 2009
- Headquarters: Worcester, Massachusetts, United States
- Area served: Central Massachusetts
- Key people: Luke M. Vaillancourt
- Services: Business Directory
- Divisions: 4
- Website: worcesterscene.com

WorcesterScene.com (WorcesterScene) is an independently owned American website based in Worcester, Massachusetts founded by Luke M. Vaillancourt and an anonymous business partner in 2008. The site was founded as the first, directory-based resource containing the most up to date listing of all restaurants, entertainment venues, bars and galleries in Worcester Proper. The site's original mission was to "provide an accurate, comprehensive, and unbiased listing of all Worcester-based businesses that serve food, mix drinks, and further the arts;" it's focused on the "where" versus the "what."

== History ==
In 2007, Vaillancourt was searching online for information about new restaurants to visit in Worcester. As he searched online he realized the same restaurants kept coming up in searches and that the smaller, lesser-known restaurants did not. Worcester is New England's second largest city and contained dozens of restaurants so he quickly realized the need to create a single, on-line resource that listed all of the city's restaurants and their contact information. In 2008, WorcesterScene was born as Vaillancourt created, coded, designed and deployed a website to list restaurant information, contact details, and property history for those looking to "try some place new". In early 2009, WorcesterScene expanded its listings to include bars, entertainment venues, arts, health and beauty and shopping listings. By mid-2009, WorcesterScene had accounted for and had published, the most comprehensive and complete listing of all restaurants, bars, entertainment venues, art galleries, museums, health and beauty and shopping in the city of Worcester. At the end of 2009, the health and beauty and shopping listings were removed from the site so as to keep the site's focus strictly on "where entertainment things were happening" in the city.

In 2009, WorcesterScene was one of the first Worcester-based online properties to embrace video content by creating original videos by specific subject-matter experts in the fields of wine, food, style, cigars, craft beer, craft cocktails, and whiskey.

In 2010, WorcesterScene again expanded by creating original content, both written and video, focused on food, drinks, the arts and entertainment. Linking this content with the site's directory listings allowed visitors to connect to businesses more directly based on content relative to their interests. Further integration with social media technologies, like Facebook, Twitter and FourSquare, has allowed WorcesterScene to more closely connect its visitors with the businesses they are searching for on the web site.

Later in 2010, in an effort to develop even more focused content, WorcesterScene created a sub-group called WorcesterFoodies. Worcester Foodies is a group of people who meet once a month with the common interest of experiencing and supporting the restaurants in the Worcester community—"supporting [them] financially and endorsing them via word-of-mouth and the Internet." The group, made up of 25 members (that are non-professionals in the food industry; but from a variety of backgrounds and professions) attend a different restaurant each month that is listed on WorcesterScene. Each participant orders, and pays for, a meal listed on the menu—it is then photographed, consumed and reviewed. The reviews are published on WorcesterFoodies.com and also included in the restaurant's WorcesterScene.com profile listing.

In February 2011, WorcesterScene.com partnered with Providence-based GoLocal24 with the launch of the web site GoLocalWorcester.

== Contributors ==
In addition to columns by Vaillancourt and a core group of contributors, WorcesterScene.com publishes columns by specialists in a wide range of fields such as art and music.
