= Suicide (game) =

Type of ball game

Suicide, also known as Butt's Up, Montana Ball, Wall Ball or Stitch, is a game typically played by children and teenagers. The rules vary widely from place to place; those given below are not necessarily a "standard" form of the rules.

== Setup ==
Suicide requires at least two players, and can have as many as can be accommodated by the playing area. The playing area comprises a hard surface, such as concrete, and a large, flat wall, and is usually outdoors. The game also requires a rubber ball or a tennis ball.

Suicide may be played in teams, but is most commonly played individually.

== Gameplay ==
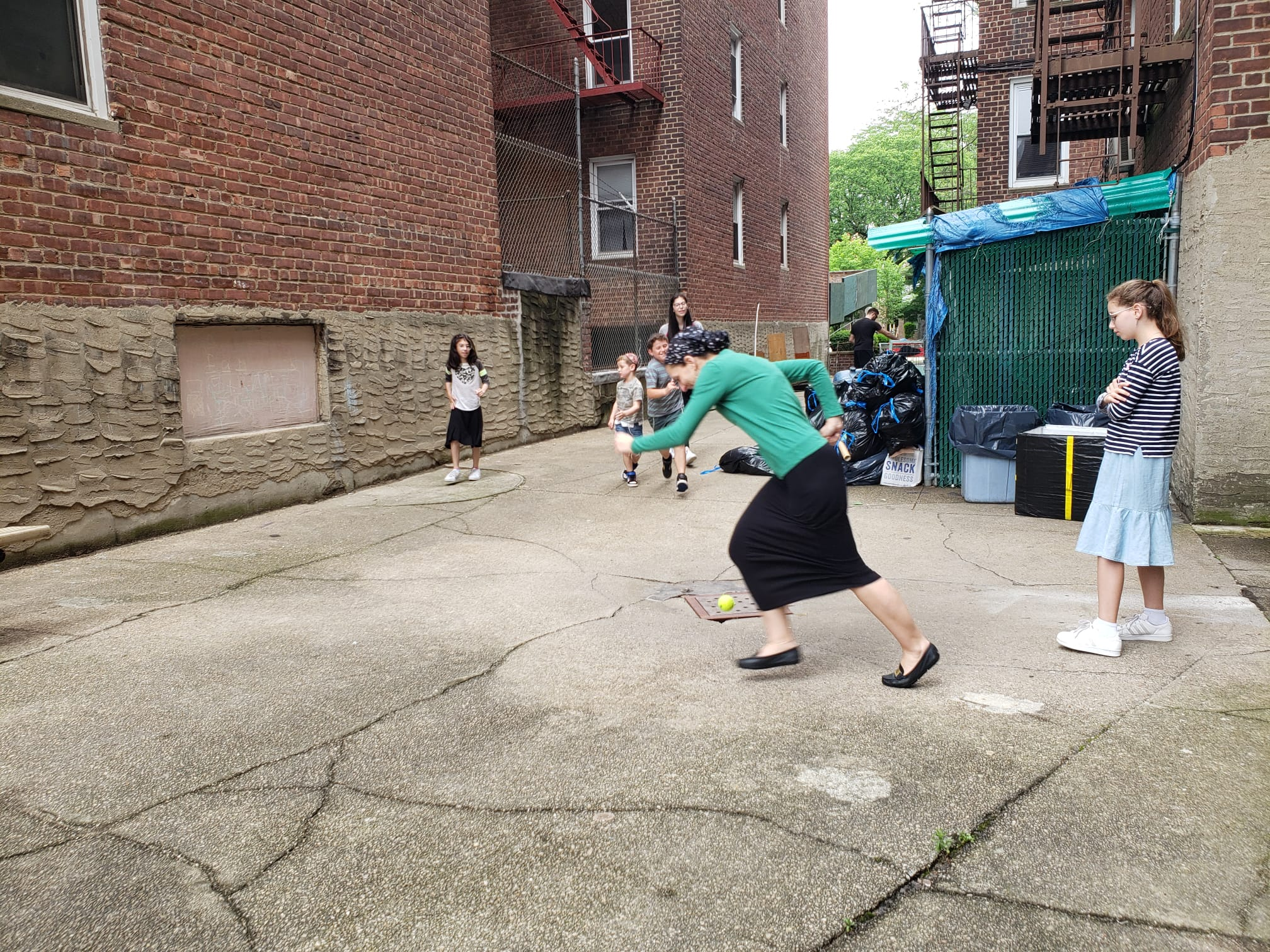
Suicide game play with players of widely varying ages. Pegging here is toward the wall and not toward players' bodies.

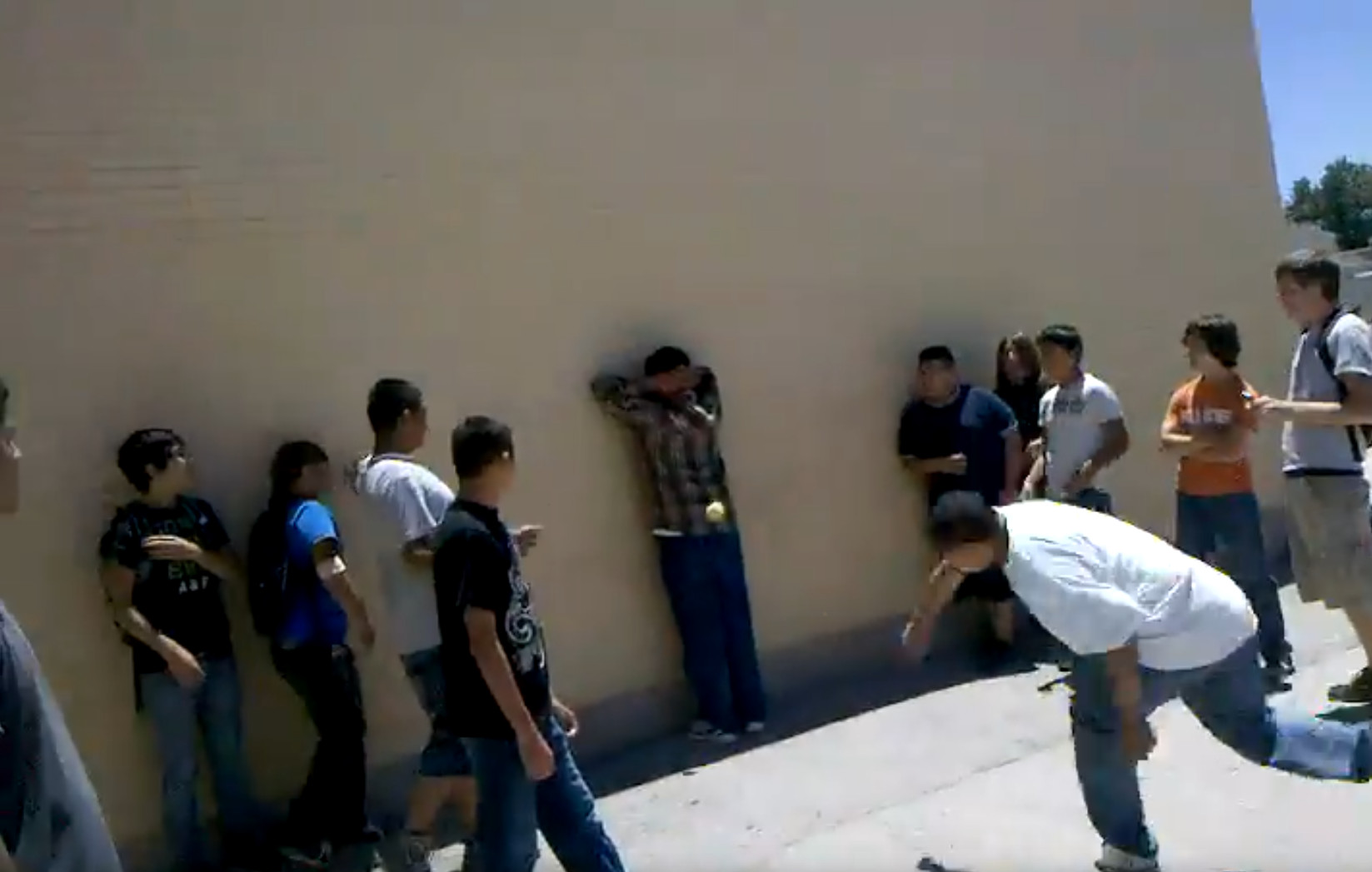
A player being pegged during a game of wall ball

The object of the game is to be the last remaining player. To stay in the game, players have to avoid being "pegged" out.

When the game begins, a player throws the ball against the wall. If the ball bounces off the wall and then hits the ground, other players are free to grab the ball and re-throw it. If the ball is caught by another player before it hits the ground, the player who threw the ball must run and touch the wall. Until the player touches the wall, they are "open" to be "pegged" (i.e., struck hard with a thrown ball) by the player who caught it. If a player comes into contact with the ball but fails to catch it, they are also "open" to be "pegged".

Some variations make changes such as, if a player catches/comes in contact with the ball, they cannot move until they throw the ball.

== See also ==
- American handball
- Dodgeball
- Tag (game)
- Wall ball
