= Snookball =

Ball sport

Snookball is a ball sport that is played on a billiard table, combining elements of snooker and association football.

== History ==
In 2014, snookball was founded by Frenchmen Aurélien Deshayes and Samuel Dreher.
