= Butts Up =

Children's playground game

- Players: 3 or more
- Setup time: None
- Playing time: No limit
- Chance: None

Butts up (also known as wall ball, butt ball and fireball) is a schoolyard game.

Players line up facing a wall, one of them throwing a tennis ball or similar-sized ball against it. If the thrower fails to catch the ball on its return, they must run and attempt to touch the wall. If another player can grab the ball and hit the player with it before they reach the wall, the runner is out of the game until the next round. The game continues until two or three players remain.

== See also ==
- Wallball
- Chinese handball
- American handball
- Pinners
