= Wallball (children's game) =

Schoolyard game

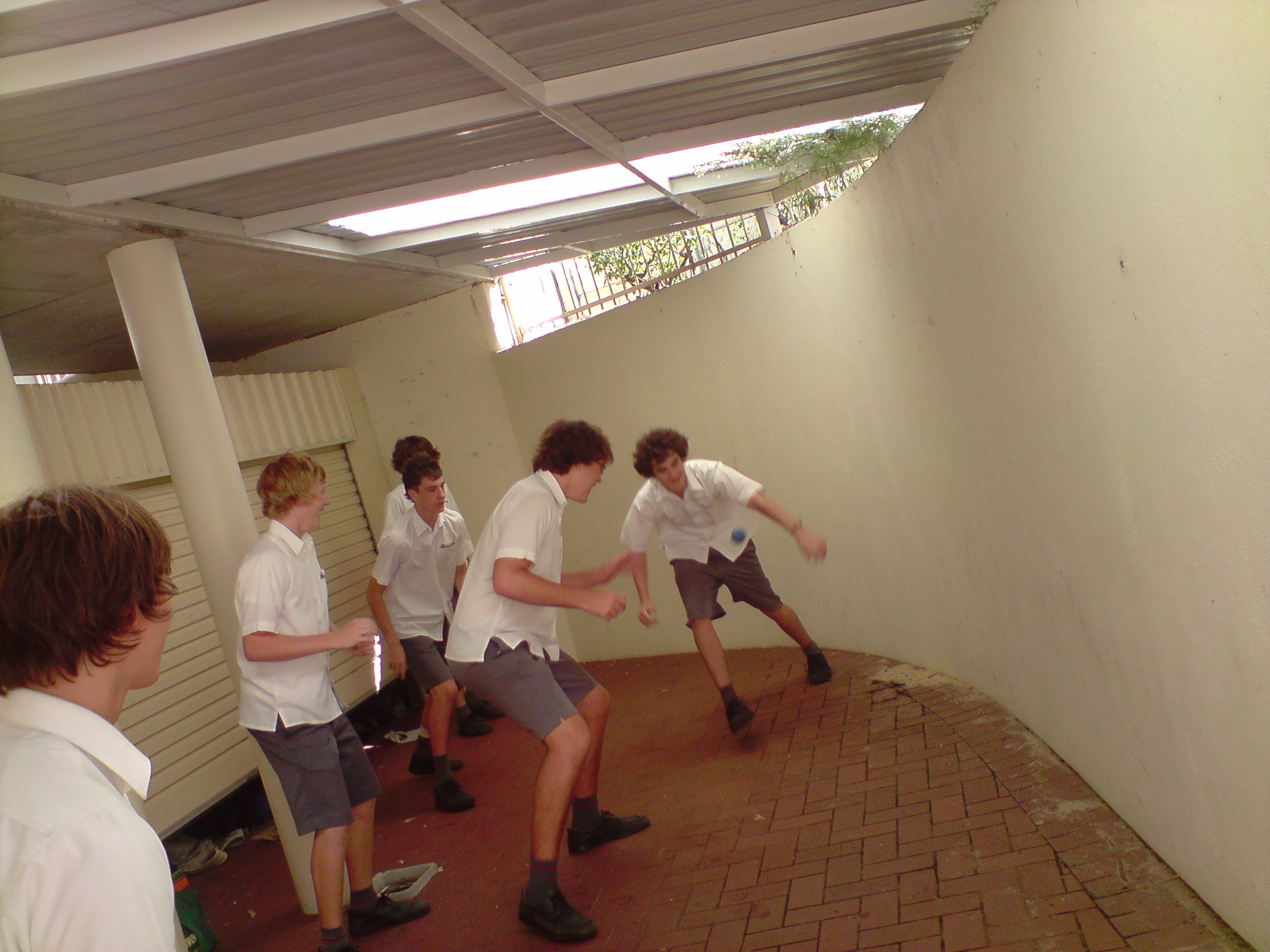
A game of wallball

Wallball is a team sport played between a various number of players per team in which players hit a bouncy ball against a wall, using their hands. The game requires the ball to be hit to the floor before hitting the wall, but in other respects is similar to squash. One player on one team may bounce the ball against the wall so a player only on the opposing team cannot bounce it back to the wall. The last person to be holding the ball after everyone is out is the winner, and their team immediately wins the game. The game requires lots of motion, and especially benefits young athletes when playing mostly at schools.

Wallball is derived from many New York City street games played by young people, often involving the Spalding hi-bounce balls popular in the 1950s. The game is similar to Gaelic handball, butts up, aces-kings-queens, Chinese handball, Pêl-Law (Welsh handball), and American handball. Wallball is sometimes referred to as downball.

== Objective ==
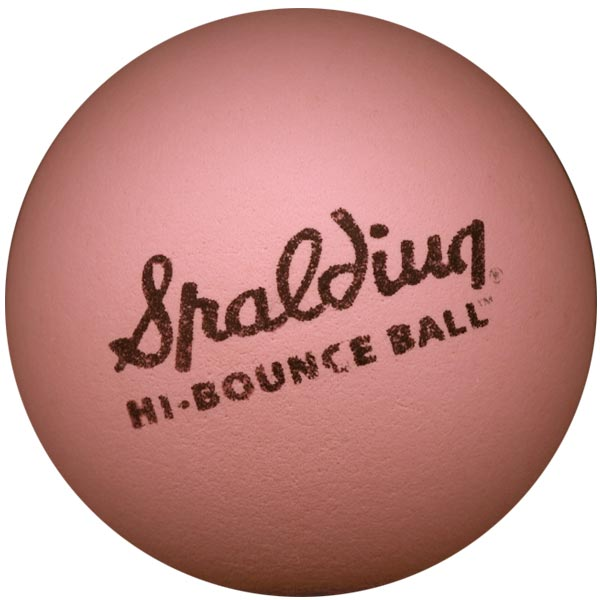
A modern Spaldeen rubber ball

The objective of wallball is to eliminate all other players in order to be the last player standing, or to be the starter of the game continuously (if the game is endless). The game consists of at least two players, goes for less than 10 minutes and only requires a bouncy ball.

The aim of the game is to hit the ball against a wall. If the person hits the wall and the ball bounces out of play the person next in line loses a life.

== See also ==
- Patball
- Chinese handball
- Downball
- Handball (schoolyard game) (Australian schoolyard variant of four-square)
- Irish Handball
- Fives
- Four square
- American handball
