= Stoop ball =

Game played with a rubber ball

Stoop ball (also spelled "stoopball") is a game that is played by throwing a ball against a stoop (stairs leading up to a building) on the pavement in front of a building. Historically, it has been popular in Brooklyn and other inner cities. In Boston, the game is known as "Up-Against", while in Chicago, the game is known as "Pinners". In Chicago's Bridgeport area the game is called "Three Outs". The game is also known as "Off the Point". It first became popular after World War II.

== Rules ==
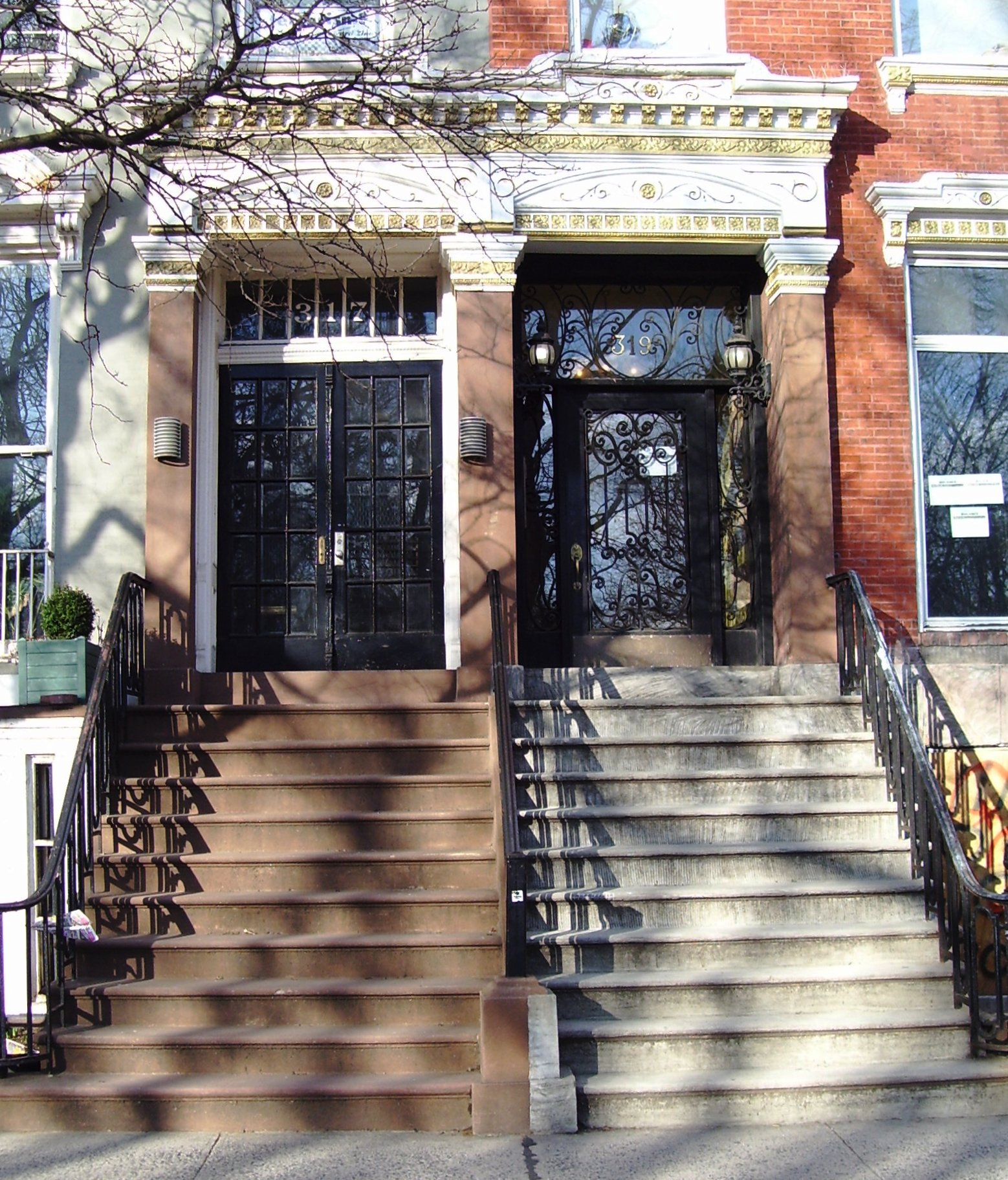
Stoops in New York City

Stoop ball is a pickup neighborhood game played near the stoop (outer concrete stairway) of a residential dwelling by a minimum of two players. The rules are based loosely on baseball. The object of the game is to score the most runs in nine innings.

One player is the "batter" and the other players are "fielders". The batter stands on the sidewalk in front of the stoop, while the fielders stand on the street. The batter makes a "hit" by throwing a pink rubber ball (either a spaldeen or a pensie pinkie) at the stoop, with the objective of making it bounce off one of the steps at such an angle and velocity that it flies as far as possible over the fielders' heads. The number of bases registered by a hit is determined from the distance traveled by the ball before it is fielded, unless the ball is caught on the fly, resulting in an out.

The Stoopball League of America holds its annual world championships every July in Clinton, Wisconsin.

== Variations ==
In addition to the "baseball rules" or "bounces" variation, there is also the "curbball" version, often played in parks. The "original" version of stoop ball is a solitary game, with the same player both throwing the ball and attempting to catch it and earning points based on how many times the ball bounced before it was caught. In northern New Jersey, around 1960, the game was known simply as "pinkie ball" and was often played off the curb on residential streets. Using only the curb resulted in many 1-0 games. In St. Louis, Missouri, this game was known as "stepball", where it was played from at least the 1930 to the 1980s. A Portable Stoopball Striker has even been patented.

== Popular culture ==
Stoopball has been played and enjoyed by a number of prominent persons. Sandy Koufax played stoop ball before beginning his Hall of Fame baseball career, and announcer Marv Albert missed the city game so much that he had a stoop constructed at his house in the suburbs. Billy Joel played stoop ball on suburban streets.

A 2010 PBS documentary, New York Street Games, features stoopball and gives a brief history of the sport as it pertains to New York City.
