= Wireball =

Ball game

Wireball is a street game related to baseball, usually formed as a pick-up game, in urban areas of the United States. The equipment consists of a pimple or pensie pinkie ball and a convenient place in a street or driveway where an electric power line or group of power lines bisect horizontally. The rules come from baseball and are modified to fit the situation. It can be played with one or more persons per team.

== Rules ==
Opponents stand facing each other on opposite sides of the wire. Limits of play are defined by agreement, usually the width of the street and landmark in the street such as a manhole cover as the furthest limit of the field. The object of the game is for the “batter” to throw the ball over or hit the wire to get a hit. The fielder must catch the ball before it bounces to make an out. Hits are scored accordingly- a ball thrown successfully over the wire and uncaught is a single. A ball that touches the wire and continues over it is a double. A ball that hits the wire squarely and drops straight down is a home run. If the fielder touches but does not catch a home run ball, it is a triple. If the batter throws the ball under the wire it is a strike. As in baseball, foul balls count as strikes for the first two, but you cannot foul-out. The rules vary from neighborhood to neighborhood.

== Tips ==
The ball is thrown hard and high above the wires. The closer the batter can get to a vertical trajectory the better. It is not unusual for the batter to stand almost directly below the wire. The game is more fun and easier if a group of wires is used (two or three).

== See also ==
- Ball game
