= Handball (schoolyard game) =

Oceanian ball game

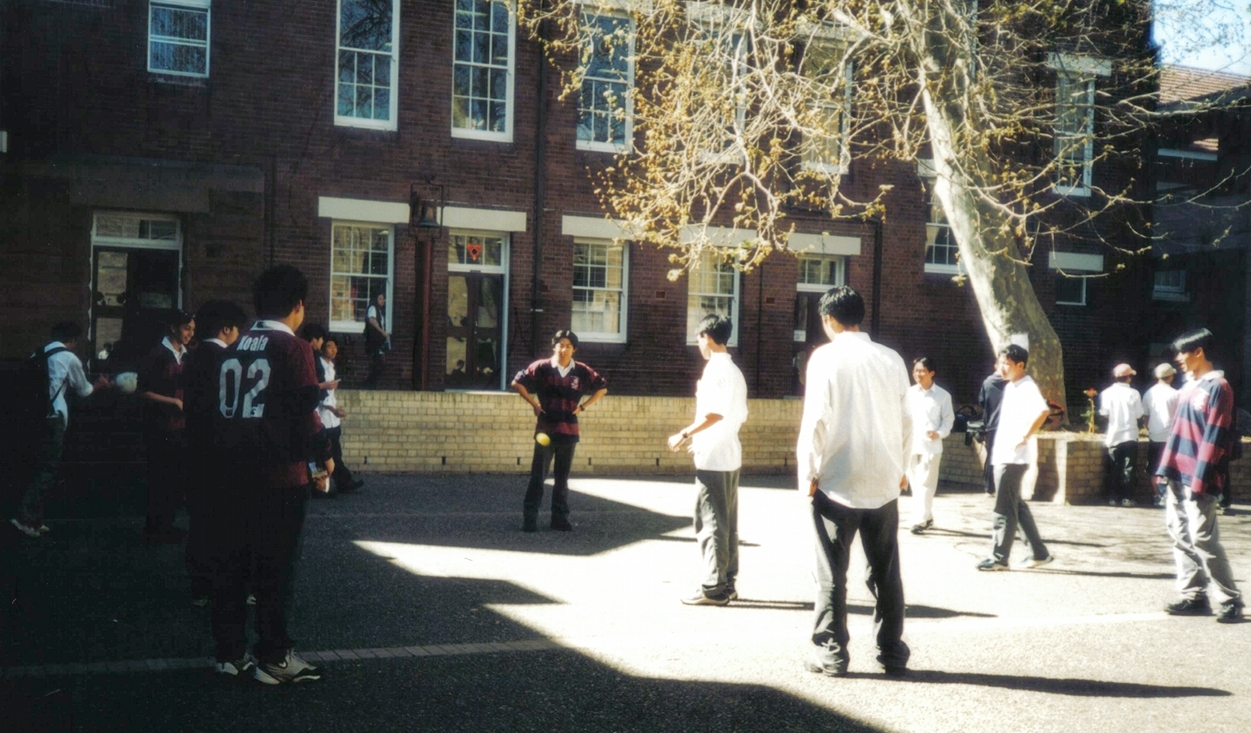
- Teens at Fort Street High School, Sydney, playing handball, 1997–2002.
- Players: 2 minimum
- Skills: Manual dexterity Strategy; Social skills Eye-hand coordination Endurance; Determination

Handball is a children's folk ball game played in Australia, New Zealand, and Fiji. The game is similar to downball and four square. The rules of the game vary across different regions and conditions, but consistent details across all playstyles is that the game is played on a flat game court with lined, gridded square or rectangular zones, and at least two players, who each occupy a square of the playing court and take turns hitting a ball with bouncy properties, often a tennis ball, squash ball or, occasionally, a bouncy ball with their bare hands. Players must first hit the ball into their own square in such a way that the next time the ball hits the ground it lands into one of the other player's squares without having to touch the ball again. The game can be adapted to environments where square or rectangular-lined flat grounds can be found, such as other gyms, arenas, parking spaces and even concrete slabbed driveways and footpaths. It is also known as four square and downball, although unrelated to the other sports of the same names.

The sport is sometimes confused with European handball, an Olympic sport that is not widely played in Australia or New Zealand.

== History ==
Schoolyard handball has been played in Australia since at least the 1950s and possibly as far back as the 1920s and 19th century. The sport originated in Australia. (Note: According to the limited sources on the history of this sport, Australia probably had handball before New Zealand because of the amount of times it is mentioned in Australia compared to New Zealand, how prevalent it is in Dorothy Howards' Australian writings, and many (although less reliable sources) saying that it was played in Australia before 1950 compared to only one reliable source saying that New Zealand played schoolyard handball in 1950.)

On July 4, 1954, the American folklorist Dorothy Howard arrived in Australia. In the next nine months, she visited nineteen primary schools across the country to painstakingly document the folk games the children played. Among the children's games Howard recorded was four square and schoolyard handball, which both were played in fourteen of the schools. The rules of the game varied between them, although the Howard noted that four square and handball were similar in some aspects. Many schools played with considerable deviations.

Schoolyard handball and four-square started being played in New Zealand in the mid-20th century. Handball is also played in Fiji. (Note: Only two sources claim that handball is played in Fiji (the sources not even being from Fiji) however there are mentions of schoolyard handball from Fiji in social media posts that cannot be used as references on Wikipedia due to the reliability issues of social media. In one of the references it also claims that the sport is played in Southeast Asia and South Africa, but no other sources exist for these regions and crucially there are no social media posts or informal indications from students or young people that refer to schoolyard handball at all or have indication that the sport is played there.)

== Rules ==
=== General Rules ===
- A game must have at least two players, but can accommodate as many players as squares that are available as long as the number of squares are even.
- Each player has a square as their territory. There are two different orders of the squares in standard four square handball. One of these versions has 'king' as the most supreme position, followed by queen, then jacks, and then dunce. This version is generally played in New South Wales and Victoria. The other version has 'ace' as the most supreme position, followed by king, then queen, and then dunce. This version is generally played in the Australian Capital Territory and South Australia.

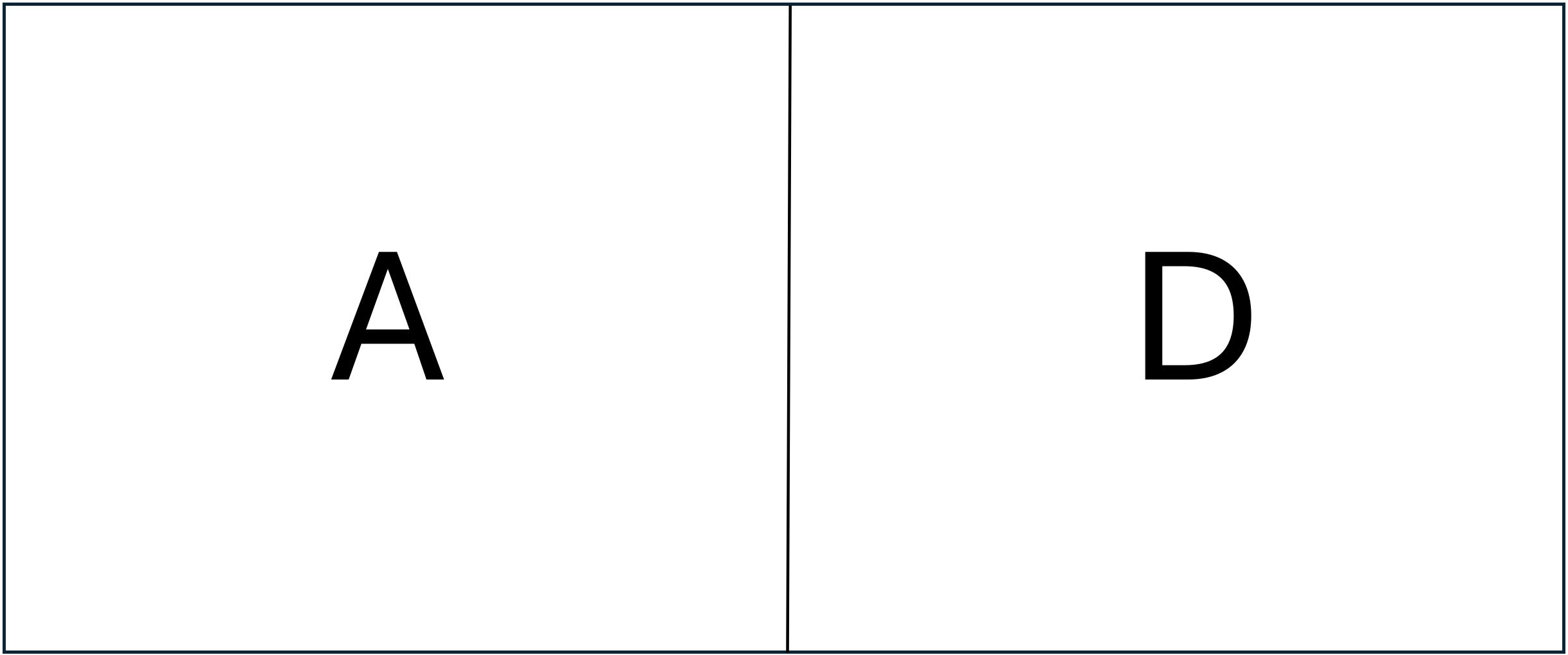

- The person in the leading square 'serves' the ball, bouncing it once within their square before it enters an opponent's square.
- Once the serve is complete, the receiver must hit the ball to any other player, including the sender.
- If a player needs to leave the playing court or the reserve line, they must say 'poison' to not lose their position.

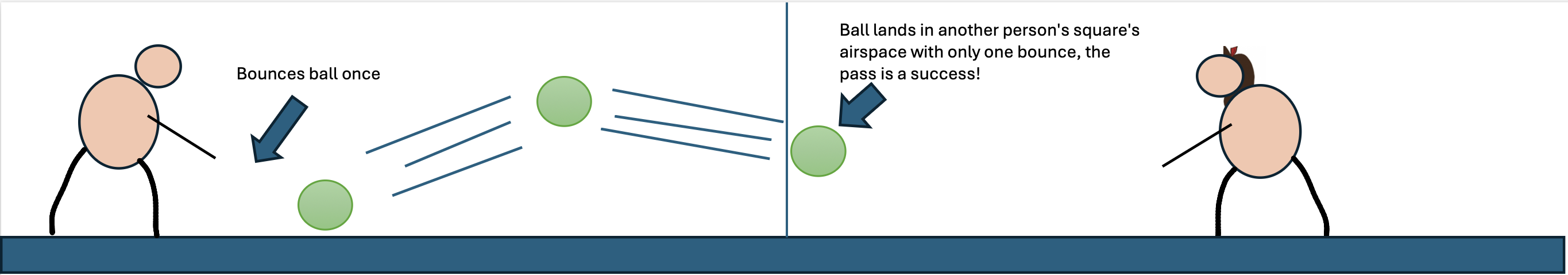
Example of a valid pass in Australian schoolyard handball

=== Ways to become 'out' ===
- When the ball lands outside of the court, the last person who touched the ball or the person in the last square the ball touched is 'out'.
- Full/Straight/Lob: When the ball lands in another player's square on the first bounce, the player has 'lobbed' or has hit a 'foul'. In some variants, if a player does not catch the ball and continues to play, they have played the lob/full, also known as a 'full play', and are therefore out.
- Double Bounce/Dubbs/Doubles: When the ball bounces twice in a person's square before or after the person hits it, the person who is in that square is out. This method is known as 'double' and 'double bounce'.
- Double Touch: The ball is touched twice in a row by the same person and this typically results in the person becoming 'out'.
- Grabs/Carry: When the ball is held or scooped instead of a clean hit, it results in the elimination or demotion of the person who grabbed.
- When a player is out, they must proceed to the lowest square, or to the end of the line of players waiting to enter the court. Players on the court who were in a lower position each move up a square. If a player is in a kings or ace square, then they usually demote to the dunce square. Sometimes the king is not moved to dunce, and instead goes straight out, other times the only square which can get a player straight out is dunce.
- Rolls/Dead Ball: If the player hits the ball in such a manner that it rolls along the ground, without bouncing, the player who hit the ball and made it roll is out.

=== Ways for a 'replay' to happen ===
- If an object/person interferes with the play, the point will be replayed, known as a 'replay'.
- Interference/In-toes/Innos: If a player interferes with another player or when a non-player interferes with gameplay, usually by walking across the court, it usually results in the offender becoming out and a replay.
- If the first bounce lands on a line and is not a 'full' or a 'double', it is known as 'lines/liner'. When 'lines/liner' is called the point is replayed.

== In popular culture ==
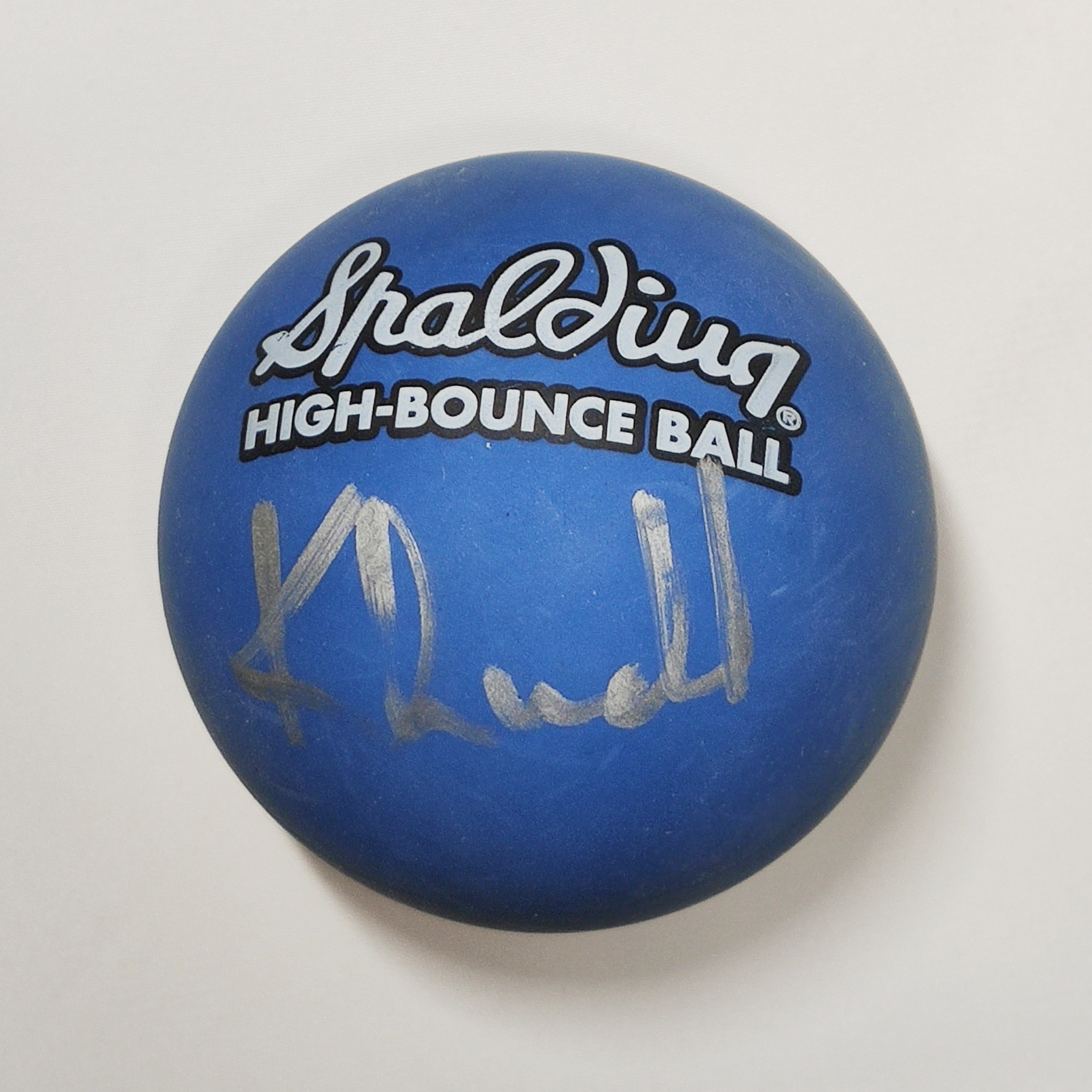
A Spaldeen autographed by Kevin Rudd

Handball has entered the meme culture. In March 2013, former Australian Prime Minister Kevin Rudd released a video of him playing handball at Brisbane State High School, which led to him becoming part of a "handball meme". In late November 2017, Rudd played handball with students in a school in Brisbane, and the accompanying video - claiming he was the "king of handball" - reached 40,000 views on Facebook.

Handball is the main theme of the children's television series, Handball Heroes, which aired on ABC Entertains (then ABC 3) in 2013, as well as Hardball which aired on ABC Entertains (then ABC Me) in 2019.
