= TagPro =

Online multiplayer capture the flag video game

- Website type: Browser game
- Available in: English
- No. of locations: Amsterdam; Atlanta; Chicago; Dallas; Frankfurt; London; Los Angeles; Miami; New York; Paris; San Francisco; Seattle; Sydney; Toronto
- Founder: Nick Riggs (a.k.a. LuckySpammer)
- Revenue: Advertisements; donations
- Website: tagpro.koalabeast.com
- Advertising: Yes
- Registration: Optional
- Current status: Online
- Written in: HTML; JavaScript; Node.js; Pixi.js

TagPro is a free-to-play online multiplayer capture the flag video game originally designed and programmed by Nick Riggs. The first version was released in February 2013, after Riggs began experimenting with software platform Node.js. The game is named after one of its three obtainable power-ups. It follows the basic rules of capture the flag, along with some modifications, including power-ups, spikes, and other map elements.

== Gameplay ==
Players spawn on opposing sides of a map after being assigned to a team. Each team consists of up to four players, for a maximum total of eight players per game. The player controls a ball using the WASD keys or the arrow keys. Players may obtain power-ups and interact with the various game elements, using them to their team's advantage or to hinder the opposing team. In the traditional game type, players must transport the enemy's flag from the enemy's spawn area to their own spawn area, avoiding enemy players and hazards. In an alternate game type, neutral flag, there is only one flag that both teams compete over to bring to their respective-colored end zones, typically located on the opposite side of the map from the teams' respective spawn area.

Other players can "pop" the flag carrier by coming in contact with their ball. Popping a flag carrier restores the flag to its original base, causes an invisible explosion at the location of the popped ball, and forces the popped ball to respawn. However, if both flag carriers touch each other, both players will pop and both flags will be reset unless one of them has a rolling bomb power up (see below). In the neutral flag game type, the flag carrier transfers the flag to the opponent that pops them. If the flag carrier is popped by an element, the flag is reset to its starting point, typically at the center of the map. The flag is also reset if the flag carrier has a TagPro and is touched by an enemy player (both players pop).

A team scores a point when it successfully returns the enemy's flag to the home location of the team's own flag. A team cannot score while their home flag is in enemy possession; the team must pop the enemy flag carrier before it can capture the enemy's flag. TagPro games last for up to 6 minutes, and end either when a team earns a 3 points differential to win the game. If the game time elapses and both teams are tied, a sudden death overtime starts, where a single cap wins the game, and where all flag carriers are automatically awarded juke juice powerups, and all players receive accumulating and increasing death penalties in the form of increased spawn times.

=== Communication ===
Players can communicate using an in-game chat feature. Players can send messages to all players, to their team only or if they are in a group they can send chat to their group. Team messages are often used to discuss strategy or to alert teammates to the location of the other team's players.

== Community ==
TagPro has been recognized for its particularly active community, especially on Reddit.

== Reception ==
TagPro has received positive reviews. Peter Cilento of The Richest gave a mostly positive review, as he listed ten "reasons you need to start playing TagPro", two of which were "You can play with friends or strangers" and "it's addicting". Max Mallory of Indie Game Insider said TagPro "Is an amazing game" and complimented the fact that "Your basic TagPro arsenal isn’t in-game weapons or player boosts, but your ability to predict the positions of your opponents." Tom Sykes of PC Gamer listed TagPro as one of the games in his "free webgame round-up". He wrote, "TagPro doesn't look like much, and it's a little too ad-heavy for my liking, but there's a tactical, seemingly well balanced online multiplayer game waiting for you behind all that." The mystery writer G.T. Karber selected TagPro as one of the five games on his perfect fictional games console on Simon Parkin's podcast My Perfect Console in 2024.
