= Stoop (architecture) =

Small outdoor entrance staircase

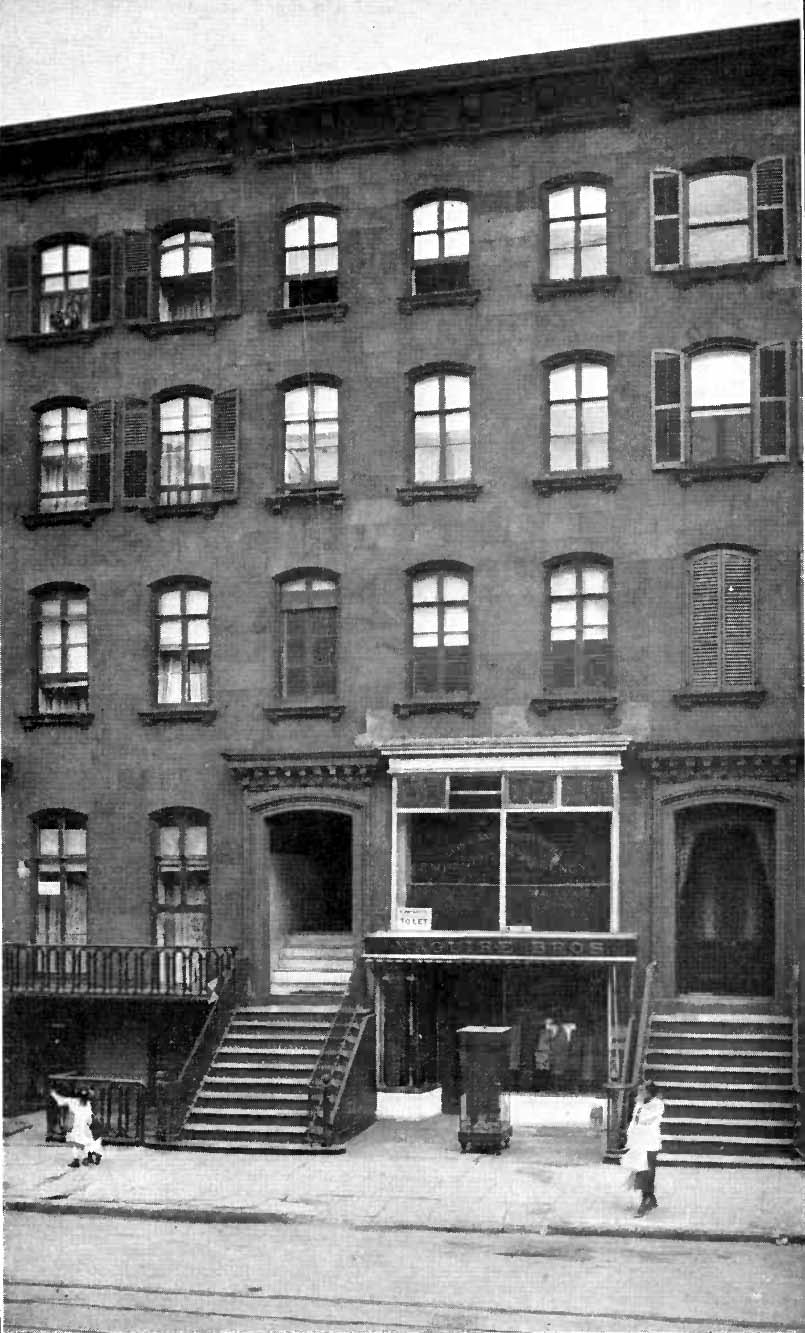
Two row houses with stoops

In American English, a stoop is a small staircase ending in a platform and leading to the entrance of an apartment building or other building.

== Etymology ==
Originally brought to the Hudson Valley of New York by settlers from the Netherlands, the word "stoop" is part of the Dutch vocabulary that has survived there from colonial times until the present. Stoop, "a small porch", comes from Dutch stoep (meaning: step/sidewalk, pronounced the same as English "stoop"); the word is now in general use in the Northeastern United States and is probably spreading.

== History ==
New York stoops may have been a simple carry-over from the Dutch practice of constructing elevated buildings.

It has been well documented that the stoop served the function of keeping people and their homes separated from horse manure, which would accumulate in the streets at high rates. Horses were the main transport means in New York for decades, and thousands of them were kept in the city by common citizens.

== Stoops as a social device ==
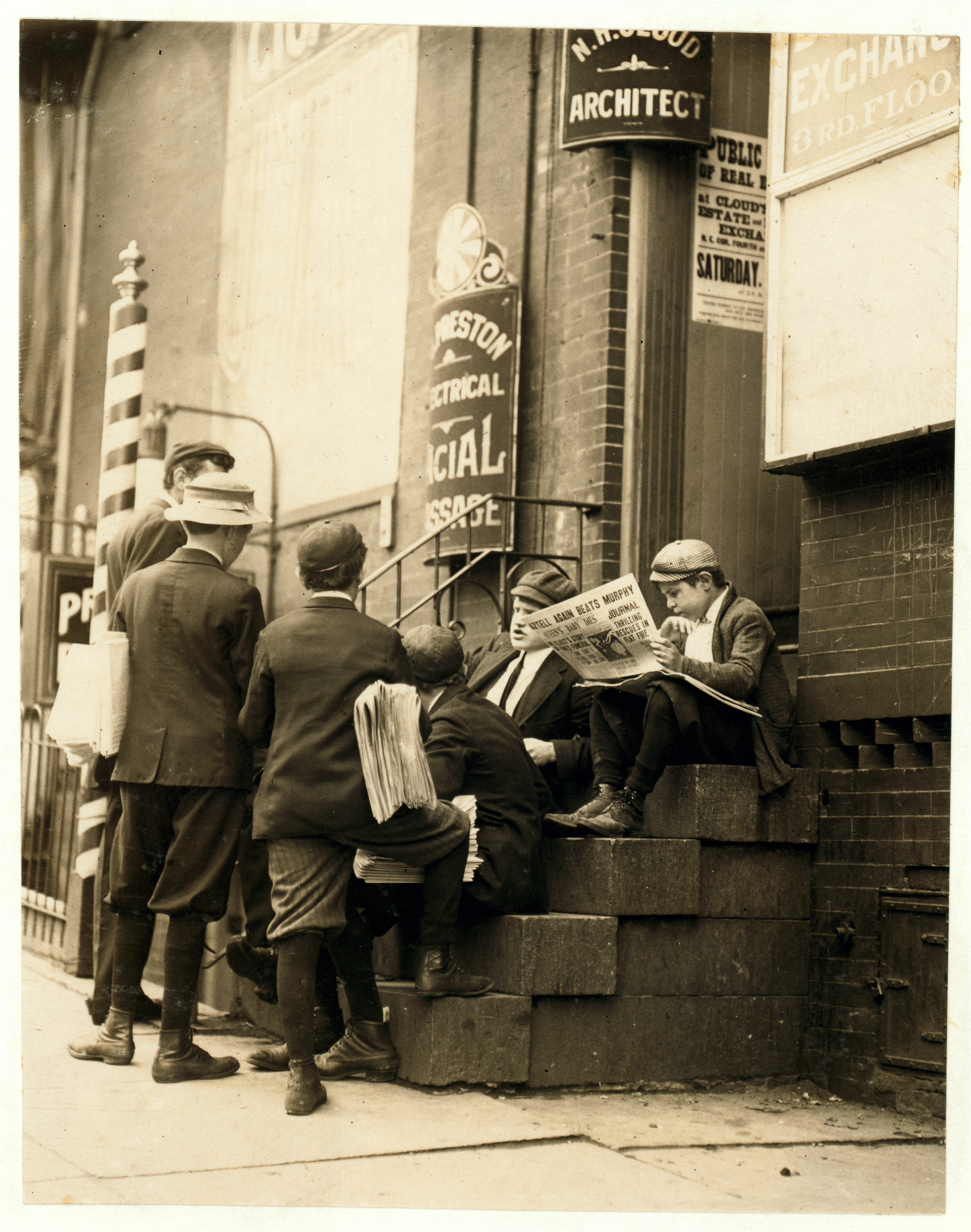
Newsboys congregating on a stoop, 1910

Traditionally, in North American cities, the stoop served an important function as a spot for brief, incidental social encounters. Homemakers, children, and other household members would sit on the stoop outside their home to relax, and greet neighbors passing by. Similarly, while on an errand, one would stop and converse with neighbors sitting on their stoops. Within an urban community, stoop conversations helped to disseminate gossip and reaffirm casual relationships. Similarly, it was the place that children would congregate to play street games such as stoop ball. Urbanites lacking yards often hold stoop sales instead of yard sales.

In her pivotal book The Death and Life of Great American Cities, Jane Jacobs includes the stoop as part of her model of the self-regulating urban street. By providing a constant human presence watching the street, institutions such as stoops prevent street crime, without intervention from authority figures. In addition, they motivate better street maintenance and beautification, by giving it social as well as utilitarian value.

== See also ==
- Porch
- Porch sitting
- Third place

== Literature ==
- Jane Jacobs, The Death and Life of Great American Cities, New York: Random House, 1961
- Mario Maffi, New York City: An Outsider's Inside View, Columbus: Ohio State University Press, 2004
