= Flickerball =

Sport

Flickerball is a group sport played with an American football in similar situations to dodgeball, such as Gym Class/PE (Physical Education) classes. It is played in a group of 6 to 40 players who are equally divided into two teams. The teams separate on opposite sides of an area such a gymnasium, parking lot, or field. The game is unstructured in terms of what constitutes or if there will be outs and the length of play nor time-outs. There are many rules, and the game is structured most similarly to Ultimate Frisbee. One notable exception is that any shot on goal results in the ball going out of bounds which results in an automatic change of possession. This rule should mitigate wild shots hoping for statistical points.

Flickerball was first played at Davidson College in 1951, when it evolved as an alternative to touch football. The name "flickerball" was developed in the mid-1950s and the game is still a traditional game at Davidson College.

The basic setup is as follows: Each team's board (which has a large hole in the middle that look much like a backboard with the box cut out and around six feet off the ground) is positioned at opposite ends of the field. A boundary line is then placed in play approximately 12 ft. from the board and lies parallel to the board. Rules are that all players can hold the ball for only five seconds and can take a maximum of three steps forward (players may go in any other direction any number of steps within 5 seconds) and can either pass or shoot to end the possession. The field length is not standard, but the width is usually 1/3 to 1/2 the size of the length and length is about 50 yards for standard size teams.

The game begins with players split on each side as is the custom. Players meet at midfield where a jump ball begins the game. Whenever the ball hits the ground the team to touch it last loses possession. The team that gains control must first make a pass laterally or backward (unless the ball went into their Defensive endzone in which case the ball is played as if off a score). Fouls may be called by a referee or by player agreement if a referee is not present. A foul shot is only given if the player is shooting and if the player misses the attempted shot. shots with fouls that result in a score off the initial shot are not called. A made shot is worth one point if it hits the board and two if it goes through the middle. A missed shot is automatically out of bounds, and the other team is given possession unless the shot was tipped by the other team. Normal game times will run about 40 minutes and may or may not have a break at the 20-minute mark.

An alternate version of the game, which is commonly played in Wisconsin, follows a different set of rules. After a coin toss and sides are chosen the defending team must send the ball, a throw off of sorts, down to the opposite end of the playing field in which the other team receives. The ball is then passed between teammates with an allotted 3 steps. If the ball crosses into the end zone the offensive team receives one point and the defending team must walk down to the other side. The ball is then thrown off again and again until the game is over. If the ball is dropped at any point in the game, the defending team gains possession. A typical game lasts 30 minutes and consists with teams of 8. This version of the game is a favorite of the Sheboygan North Cross-Country team and the Sheboygan Community as a whole.

Flickerball was once commonly played at United States Air Force educational institutions with the following ruleset:

The last of the three team sports played by SOS students is flickerball. This is a less well-known sport, although common to Air Force educational institutions. Flickerball is played on a rectangular field, 53 and 1/3 yards in length and 30 yards wide. There is a goal located 5 yards behind the endline, centered between the sideline markers and parallel to the endline.

Each team consists of seven players. The game has eight 4-minute periods, divided into quarters and halves. Each student participates a minimum of two complete periods in each half.

The object of flickerball is to score points by advancing the flickerball from one end of the field to the other. To score, the ball must be thrown at the goal behind the endline. To advance the ball, it may be thrown laterally or passed forward. No player may run or walk forward toward their goal with the ball. In maneuvering for position, players may only move away from his/her goal. A player gaining control of the ball while advancing toward his/her goal must establish a pivot foot with the first foot touching the ground. The player must clearly stop on this foot before passing or shooting.

Flickerball combines the rules of tag football and basketball with several variations. It is a fast game due to restrictions on possession times for such things as passing, shooting, and inbounding. With passing the ball, there are increased chances for physical contact. No team player may intentionally cause contact with another player. Physical contact results in a penalty to the player not avoiding the contact....
