= Balonpesado =

The balonpesado is a team sport, devised for both open field as closed, in which two sets of five players each try to score goals within circles drawn on the ground of each end of the field. It remains as the only team sport which is indigenous to Colombia.
