= Penn Racquet Sports =

American based tennis and racquet ball manufacturer

Penn Racquet Sports Inc
- Company type: Subsidiary
- Industry: Sportswear and sports equipment
- Founded: 1910 (Jeannette, Pennsylvania, United States)
- Products: Sports equipment Accessories; Sportswear
- Parent: Head N.V.
- Website: http://www.pennracquet.com

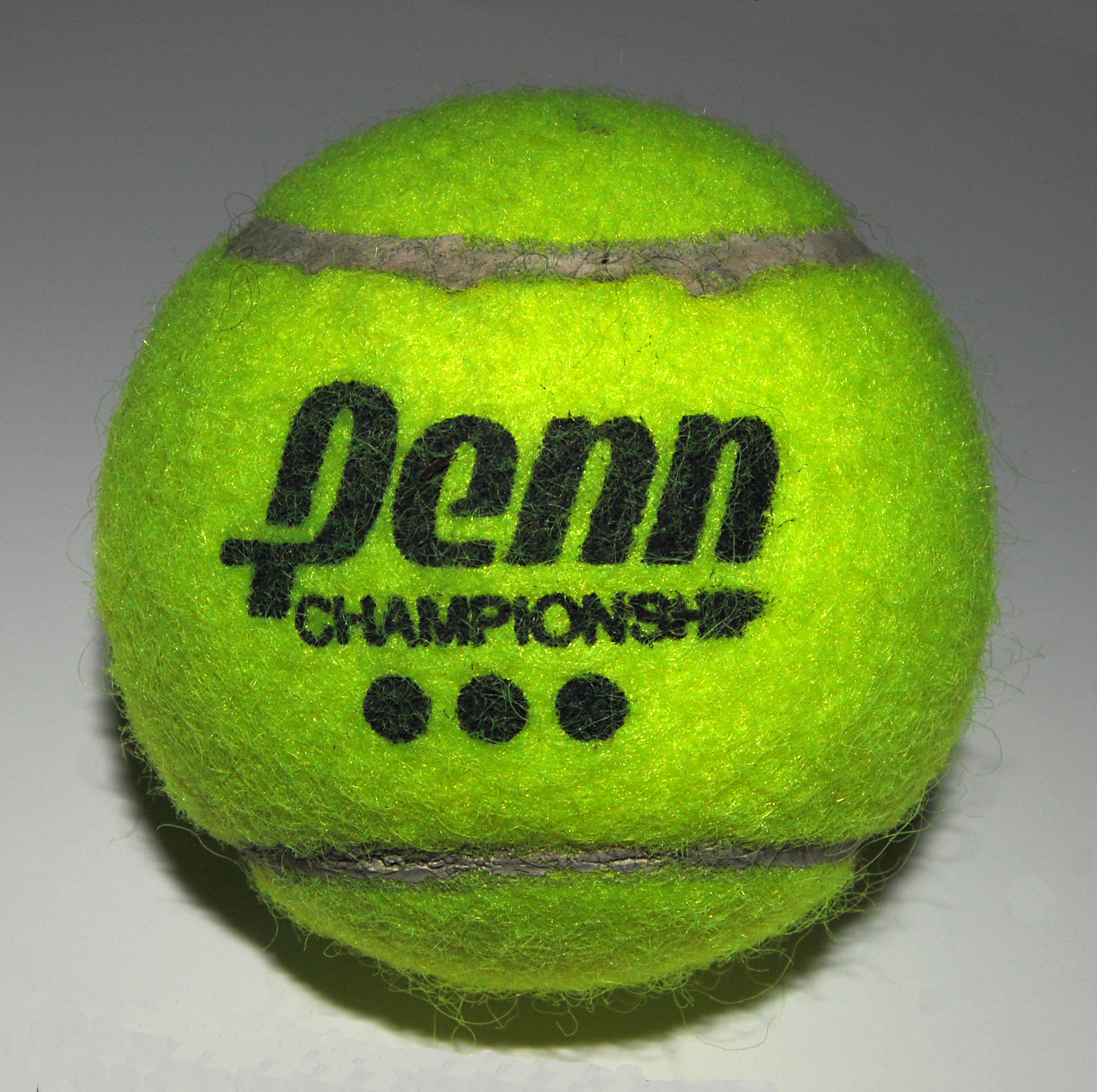
A Penn Championship tennis ball

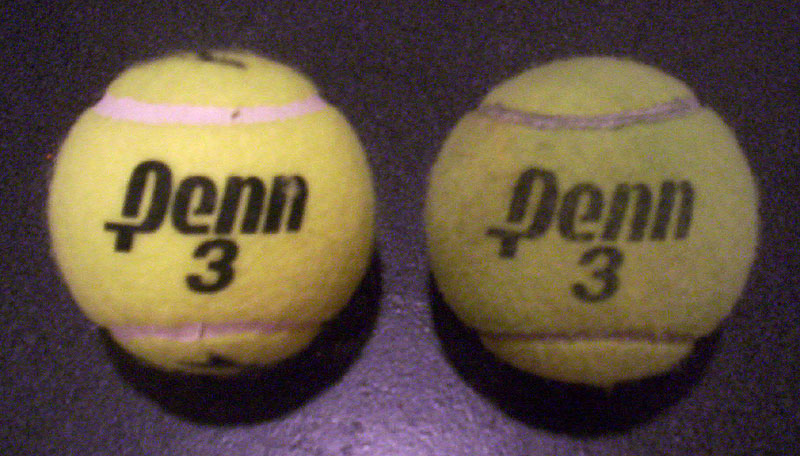
Penn 3 balls, new and used

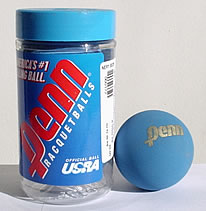
Penn racquetball

Penn Racquet Sports, Inc. is a subsidiary of Head N.V. that manufactures tennis balls and racquetballs. Penn was founded in 1910 as Pennsylvania Rubber Company of America, Inc. in Jeannette, Pennsylvania. Penn was acquired by Head N.V. in 1999 and is currently headquartered in Phoenix, Arizona.

== History ==
In 1910, Penn began manufacturing tennis balls in Jeannette, Pennsylvania. Penn has a subsequent history of innovation in tennis ball design:

In 1922, Penn makes the first pressurized ball cans.

In 1960, Penn invents a more durable felt cover for the tennis ball by weaving New Zealand wool and artificial fibers together.

In 1968, Penn makes the first fluorescent green tennis ball.

In 1970, Penn debuts "play-rated" balls - unique tennis balls for different court surfaces and high-altitude areas.

Penn was chosen as the official tennis ball of the US Professional Tennis Association in 1973. Penn racquetballs are the official balls of the IRT and U.S. Racquetball Association.
