= Australian handball =

Ball game

- Years active: 1847 to present
- Players: One player vs another, or doubles (2 on 2)
- Setup time: Minimal, if any
- Chance: None
- Skills: Manual dexterity Social skills Walking; Gross motor skill Running

Australian handball is a sport in which players strike a small ball against one or more walls using their hands. It is distinct from the Olympic sport of team handball, being more closely related to other wall/handball sports such as Gaelic handball, Welsh handball, and American handball. Organised forms of the game were recorded in Australia as early as 1923.

== Rules of play ==
Australian handball is generally played in an enclosed court in which players strike a small ball directly against a front wall using their palm or fist rather than a racquet or other equipment. Play begins with a serve, in which the ball is hit directly against the front wall without first bouncing on the ground, and then the opposing player must return the ball before it bounces twice. During play the ball may rebound from side walls either before or after striking the front wall, but after a player strikes the ball it must contact the front wall before touching the ground.

The game can be played in singles or doubles formats on courts with one, three, or four walls, with the three-wall court the most common configuration used for organised play. Courts used for the sport are found at a number of educational institutions and sporting facilities in Australia. A similar game is played in Ireland.

== History and development ==
=== Early days ===
The game has been played in some capacity since the 19th century, with the first Australian handball court built by Melbourne hotel keeper Michael Lynch in 1847. Its formal beginnings in Australia date from 1923, and its early development has been attributed to the work of the Christian Brothers' Colleges, who considered that handball "affords an excellent preparatory training for football, as it calls into play all the resources of the physical man".

Since its inception, the game has primarily been played in Victoria, South Australia, and New South Wales, and by 1970 there were about 1,000 players registered with these three territories' state associations. However, modernisation of school grounds has meant the disappearance of many traditional handball courts, making it harder for players to access the game.

=== National competition ===
The game is run nationally run by the Australian Handball Council, formed in 1928, with the current executive director being Jim Kiley and the Secretary/Treasurer Greg Hay.

The Council has held almost-annual national championships for decades, and each state has held its own state titles. During the 1950s and 1960s both the Australian Singles Schoolboys Handball Championships and the Australian Doubles Schoolboys Handball Championships were held on a regular basis, and Australians have made regular appearances at both the World Junior and World Senior Titles.

Within Australia the chief rivalry has been between Victoria and South Australia. For the past three decades these two states have generally competed for the national handball championships over one weekend annually at a 'midpoint' venue, often Warrnambool, Victoria.

== Notable players ==
Notable players from the first half of the 20th century include national champions Jim Flattery, Tim Tucker, and George Macris. Notable players from the second half of the 20th century include John Hughes, Paul Fallon, Lou Ravesi, Vic DeLuzio, and Geoff Walsh.

== See also ==
- Hack Slap, an analogous game played with feet instead of hands.
- Handball (school), a popular game played in schools in Australia — a schoolyard variant of Four square.
