= Chinese handball =

Form of American handball

Chinese handball is a form of American handball popular on the streets and schoolyards of New York City, Philadelphia, and Bridgewater during the 1950s, 1960s, 1970s, and 1980s and still played today, mostly in New York City, Philadelphia, and San Diego. Different variations are played around the world. Its defining feature is that, unlike traditional handball, in Chinese or indirect handball, for a shot to be valid, the ball must hit the ground before it hits the wall. Because it is often played with large or irregular numbers of players, it is considered a more social and accessible alternative to conventional American handball, especially in schoolyard settings.

== Origin of name ==
The name "Chinese" handball is American in origin. Like the terms "Chinese checkers" or "Chinese fire drill", the name identifies it as an "exotic" or confusing variation on something more familiar to Westerners.

== Gameplay and rules ==
Chinese handball can be played by any number of players that can comfortably fit on the court at once. In the United States, it is traditionally played with either a "Spaldeen" pink bouncy ball or an American handball ball, whereas Chinese-style Australian variations conventionally use tennis balls, and other ball options are possible. It is usually played on American handball courts, but is also often played with two opposing walls ("hallway" or "mini-court" style), or three adjacent walls. For all shots, there are several rules that must be followed for the play to be valid. The ball may be hit only once, without being "caught" or "handled", and after hitting the wall, its first bounce must land within the bounds of the court, same as in American Handball. After being struck and before hitting the wall, however, it must hit the floor.

The game is usually played with large numbers, in an elimination style. If a player makes an invalid return, they are "out", and exit the court. Traditionally, players go one after another in a set order, returning the ball until a player fails to make a legal return, at which point that player is out. In some versions of the game, whoever is closest to the ball, other than the previous hitter, is expected to hit the ball. In these versions, if the ball is allowed to bounce twice without being hit or "watermeloned", whoever was nearest the ball is declared out. The person who had hit the ball last normally gets the next serve, but as a primarily social game, speed of play and flow are paramount, so whoever collects the ball may serve themselves to save time. In the fixed order version of the game, players realign in the fixed order and the server serves the ball once again. This process continues until only one player remains, who is declared the winner. After the round concludes, all players may reenter the court to begin a new game. Traditionally, the reigning champion receives the first serve in the next round, while the remaining players return in the reverse order of their elimination.

1v1 duels or American-style 2v2 can also be played, with teams alternating hitting the ball and points awarded whenever the opposing team fails to make a valid return.

Chinese handball, like its American relative and other playground games, is generally self-regulated. This means rules may be customized for any given match by those playing. In cases where the validity of a shot is disputed or there is disagreement over who was closest to a ball that was left to bounce twice, those outside the dispute may decide the call, or the round is replayed. Refereeing is democratic, and if most players on the court agree on a decision, the player in question is expected to accept it. There is often room for debate or talk-back, colloquially known as "fishmongering" among New York's Upper East Side Chinese Handball communities, but with rounds lasting only a few minutes, flow of play is prioritized over prolonged discussion.

=== Variations ===
In New York variations of the sport, "watermelons" are a risky alternative to hitting the ball. When the ball has bounced once, players may duck under the ball (usually their head is required to pass directly under the ball's flight path) to complete a watermelon. The ball is then allowed to bounce an additional time before another player must hit it, or watermelon it again. In some versions of the game, multiple watermelons in a row are not permitted. If any part of the player's body hits the ball, or the ball's next bounce lands out of bounds, the watermelon is invalid and the player who attempted it is out. Watermelons can serve as a good way to force one's opponent to the back of the court in 1v1s, to slow down the speed of play, or to catch opponents off-guard for an easy out. In some versions of the game, however, watermelons are illegal once the game has reached the 1v1 stage to ensure that each player has a fair chance of returning the ball. To prevent unfair aces, serves are often required to be "melonable", meaning someone could feasibly fit their head under the ball, and the ball's second bounce, were it to be "watermeloned", would be in-bounds. Variations without this rule often allow the first player to reject a bad or difficult serve by saying "no take". Serves may be hit or thrown.

Multi-bounce variation

In some versions of this New York variation, players may allow the ball to bounce multiple times before returning it. The type of return that is considered valid depends on the number of bounces. Traditionally, a ball that has bounced once may be returned with either a standard hit or a “watermelon,” while a ball that has bounced twice may be returned with an under-the-leg strike. Under-the-leg strikes may be performed either by raising one leg and hitting the ball underneath it, or by turning around and returning it between the legs. If the ball bounces three or more times, it must be kicked to remain in play. Regardless of the number of bounces, the ball must strike the ground before hitting the wall, as in standard play, and the return must still land within the boundaries of the court. This variant of Chinese handball is usually colloquially referred to as simply “Watermelon.”

The game may also be played with the multiple bounce rules, without the watermelon rule. Furthermore, special games that require each player to do some kind of special return are sometimes played for the sake of variety and difficulty. This might entail the players only being allowed to return with under-the-leg shots and kicks, or players only being allowed to return with trick shots, such as using parts of the body other than the hand to return, punching the ball instead of using an open hand, and more. Oftentimes, the same court may switch the rules from standard play to other variants from game to game for diversity of play.

=== Additional rules ===
In the event that the players are playing on a court with an uneven wall or ground surface, irregular bounces are often considered to merit a re-do. If a player believes the ball has bounced irregularly, they can call "bad bounce" or sometimes "hindu," indicating that they would like a round re-do due to the unfair bounce. This rule allows the game to be played on a wide variety of courts regardless of their condition, and makes the game more fluid and fair in schoolyard settings and similar circumstances. Some variants of the game also allow a re-do in the event that a ball rolls away from the wall rather than bouncing, which can be called with the phrase "egg roll". Games that do not allow "egg rolls" to be redone typically require the rolling ball to be returned with a kick. A round is also often replayed if the ball hits the wall and the ground at the same time where the wall meets the ground, sometimes also referred to as a "hindu". Other versions of the game consider this type of return to simply cause the player to be out.

Another instance where a re-do is typically allowed is when a player or spectator is blocking the return by standing in the path of the ball or in the path of the player attempting to return the ball. This can be called with the phrase "interference," and the round starts over. Oftentimes, repeat interferences by a player may result in that player getting out at the digression of the other players. Intentional interference typically results in an instant out for the interfering player, also at the digression of the other players.

On some courts, if a player has not gotten a fair chance to return the ball with a kick due to it traveling too far too fast, the player may request a "roll". In this case, the server will roll or lightly bounce the ball to the player who did not get a chance to return, and that player must perform a successful kick return to remain in the game. The player is typically expected to kick the ball from roughly the same location the ball was traveling, and the roll is typically meant to mimic how the ball was moving in terms of speed, angle, and bounce height. If the kick is successful, the round may be restarted with the player being allowed back in, or the round may simply continue by the next player in line returning the ball that was just successfully kicked.

== Strategy ==
Players often attempt to hit the ball in such a way that it is difficult for the next player to return, which can be accomplished in a variety of ways. The most common way to make a shot difficult to return is by performing a "drop shot", where a player waits until the last second to return the ball such that it will bounce very low to the ground. These shots are difficult to return and often require the next player to use a multiple bounce return. Players may also use a "soft shot", where the player returns the ball very gently, typically very close to the wall and low to the ground. This makes it very difficult to return the ball since it does not bounce very high or far. Players may also hit the ball across the court, in an attempt to "make them run for it". This strategy is especially effective in a 1v1 context. If one of the final 2 players is able to develop a rhythm of returning the ball to the opposite side of the court that their opponent is on, their opponent will have to run back and forth to return the ball, eventually tiring them out or making it too difficult to return the ball at the angle it was hit. This strategy is often coupled with hitting the ball at a very steep angle, such that the ball bounces far to the sides of the court after hitting the ground within bounds and thus making it very difficult to return.

While frowned upon in most courts, players may also create alliances in order to target specific players to get them out in the early game. For example, player 1 may make an alliance with player 2 in order to target player 3. In this circumstance, player 1 would give player 2 a very easy shot to return, such that player 2 may set up a very difficult shot for player 3 immediately after (typically a drop shot, a soft shot, or a sharply angled shot). Alliances are more common in the early game, and typically dissolve in favor of the classic "every man for himself" play-style as the game progresses.

== Popular culture ==
A 2010 PBS documentary, New York Street Games, shows people playing Ace-King-Queen.

== See also ==
- American handball
- Australian handball
- Downball
- Wallball
