= Four square =

Elimination-based ball game played in a box

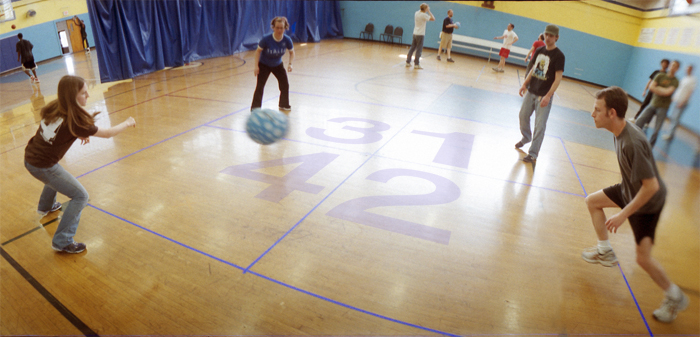
- The layout of a four square court.
- Players: 4
- Setup time: 30 seconds
- Skills: Manual dexterity Strategy; Social skills

Four square (also called Four Squares or box ball) is a sport played on a square court divided by two perpendicular lines into four identical boxes creating four squares labelled 1–4 or A–D.

Four square is a popular game at primary schools with little required equipment, almost no setup, and short rounds of play that can be ended at any time. The game also has a large following for adults in many communities.

== History ==
Four square dates to at least the 1950s. A game called four square is mentioned in newspapers in the northeastern United States at least as far back as the 1950s, but the rules are not explained. A 1953 teacher's manual describes four square with the same rules used today. However, it is possible this game could have evolved from "Jeu de paume", a game popular in France as early as the twelfth century.

== Rules ==
One player occupies each of the 4 squares at a time; the other players wait in line. The player in square 4 serves the ball into another square. Once the ball bounces into a square, the player who occupies that square must hit the ball into another square with their hands, and so on, until someone gets out. Each time a player gets out, that player leaves the court and enters the back of the line and all remaining players advance to the higher numbered square (if applicable). Square 1 is then filled with a new player from the line of awaiting players.

A player may get out as follows:

- Failing to hit the ball into another square
- Allowing the ball to bounce more than once in their own square
- Hitting the ball out of the squares or hitting a line
- Hitting the ball incorrectly such as by holding, catching, or carrying
- Hitting the ball out of turn or committing interference
- Hitting the ball one handed (in some versions of gameplay)
- Not bouncing the ball in your own square first

== Variations ==
Four square has inspired other similar games. One example is nine square, which uses a 3-by-3 grid instead of a 2-by-2 grid. The 9 square is the middle and the ball is served from this position. Another version is played similar to the original in that four players occupy their respective spots, but they must keep the ball off the ground like in volleyball.

The game is called King Out in Sweden. A similar schoolyard game is called handball.

== World Championships ==
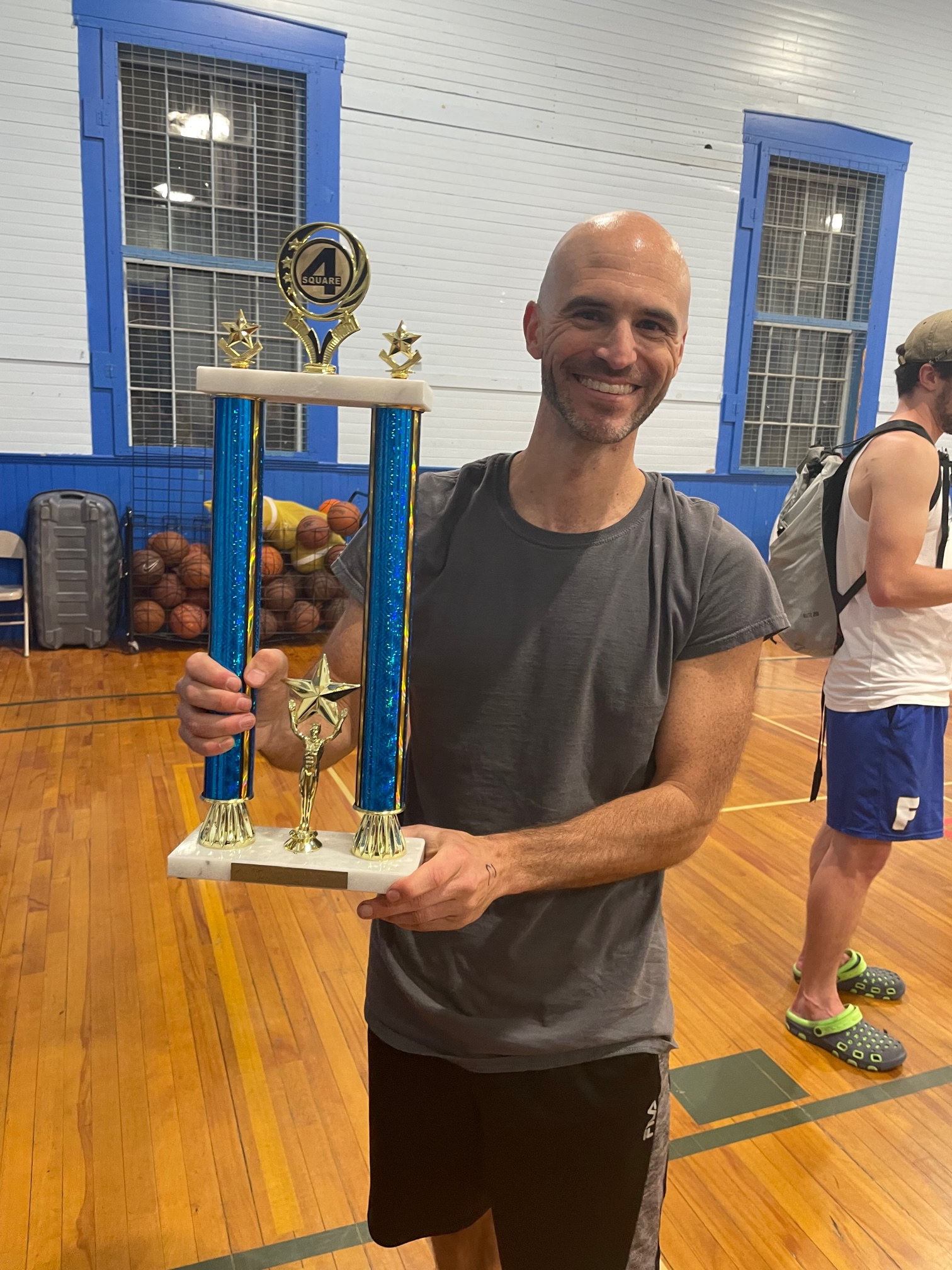
2023 Four Square World Champion Eric Costanza

Since 2005, Bridgton, ME, has hosted the annual World Four Square Championships where adults and children compete to determine the world's best four square players.

== World records ==
On August 4–5, 2012, a group of 17 Needham High School students and alumni—assisted by 50 other Needham residents at various times—broke the previous world record by playing for 34 hours, the previous record being held by 15 Manchester College students who played the game for 30 hours. The world record was held by eight Argentinean players for 29 hours in 2008, as recognized by Guinness World Records. The Argentinean record was preceded by a group of teens from Youngstown, Ohio, who also played for 29 hours.

== See also ==
- Russian four square
- Crossnet
- Wallball
- Roundnet
- Handball (schoolyard game)
- Downball
