= Downball =

Australian schoolyard ball game

Video of a game of Downball

Downball, (Note: Downball requires a wall or a squares court depending on which version of Downball is being played.) also recognised as handball or four-square, is a ball game popular in Australian schools.

== Rules ==
The game is played with a rubber high bounce ball or a tennis ball. Players take turns using their hands to hit the ball against a wall until a player misses a shot and is eliminated. The last player left is declared the winner, and the next round begins.

There are several versions of the game, one involving the playing area being divided into four squares (marked by simply placing a stick in the centre so that players can divide the space mentally). When a player is eliminated, an onlooker previously in the line (also referred to as the ries (firstly, secondary and so on) takes their place.

The order can be referred to as King, Queen, Jack and Dunce. King is first, which is the player that serves the ball each time. If the ball hits a line, which can sometimes be called ‘liner’ then either the queen serves, or king bounces the ball on the line and play on. If you have more than 4 players, but only 4 squares, there can be a line of other players waiting to move into the dunce square.

== Variations ==
In an unofficial setting, the game can be adapted to any environments where square/rectangular-lined flat grounds can be found, including parking lots, driveways and footpaths, commonly playing with a tennis ball (although very few schools use tennis balls now).

Some downball/handball rules use rebounds, which means when the ball bounces off walls. There are many terms for different moves, like some schools call it a ‘swifty’ when you hit it low and fast, but some call that a ‘fireball’. Other terms include fouls, dubbs, double touch, out, header, slugs, etc.

== Popularity ==
The game can be played anywhere, with children sometimes using uneven squares. Some play the game in lines of squares as on footpaths, and at some Australian schools there are dedicated downball courts. The name handball is more common across NSW.

== Downball Australia ==
Downball Australia was founded in February 2020 by a 16-year-old student named Noah, originally as a year 9 school project. ABC have described it as Australia's first officially recognised Downball organisation.

Downball Australia rules say to play the game on a flat indoor or outdoor court, with connected lined square zones of 1.8 by 1.8 metres (5 ft 11 in × 5 ft 11 in), with matches involving between four and seven players.
