= Bouncy ball =

Small rubber toy ball

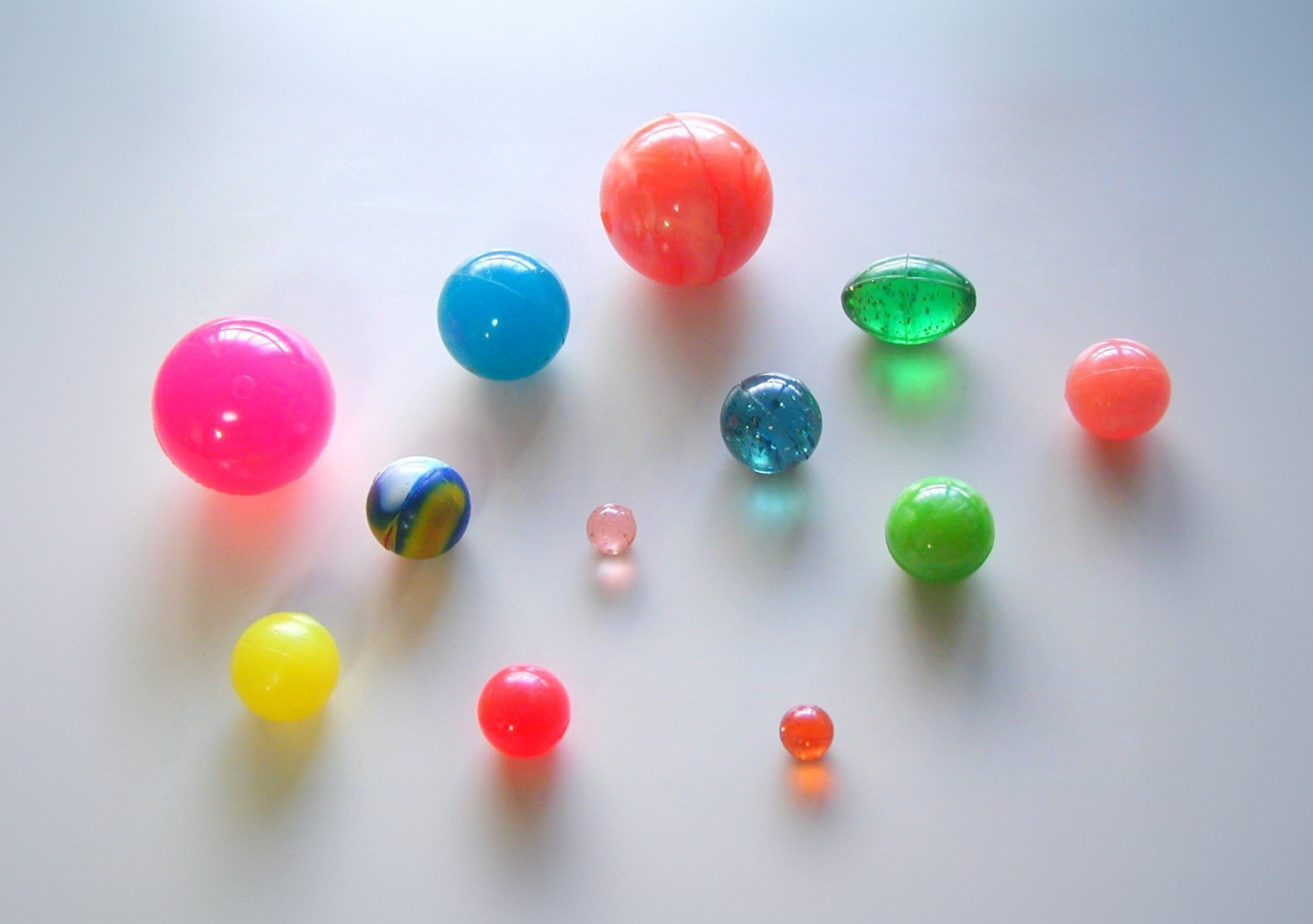
Various colorful bouncy balls

A bouncy ball or rubber ball is a spherical toy ball, usually fairly small, made of elastic material which allows it to bounce against hard surfaces. When thrown against or dropped above a hard surface, bouncy balls retain their momentum and much of their kinetic energy after impact. They can thus rebound with an appreciable fraction of their original force. Natural rubber originated in the Americas, and rubber balls were made before European contact, including for use in the Mesoamerican ballgame. Bouncy balls are a very common object of play. Christopher Columbus witnessed Haitians playing with a rubber ball in 1495.

== Spaldeens ==
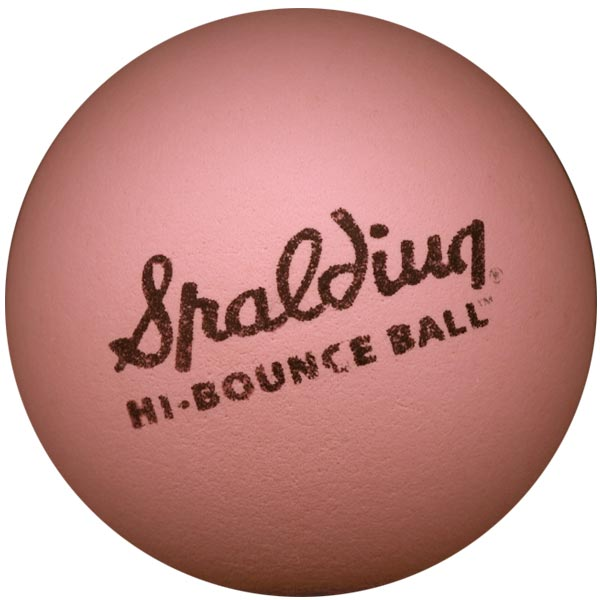
a modern-day Spaldeen

Rubber balls such as the Spaldeen (a corruption of Spalding, the manufacturer), about the size of a tennis ball and often colored pink, have been manufactured since the 1930s and remain so into the 21st century. They were fundamental to the development of American street games such as stickball, in addition to other uses in play. Other manufacturers have made similar balls, such as the Pensie Pinkie.

== Superballs ==
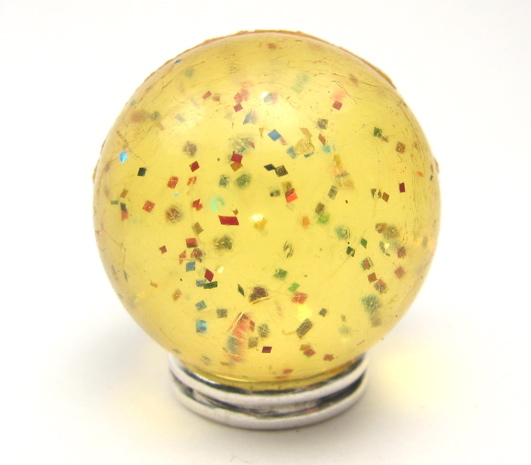
A superball

A superball or power ball is a bouncy ball composed of a type of synthetic rubber (originally a hard elastomer polybutadiene alloy named Zectron) invented in 1964, which has a higher coefficient of restitution (0.92) than older balls such as the Spaldeen so that when dropped from a moderate height onto a level hard surface, it will bounce nearly all the way back up. They were first sold by the Wham-O toy company under the name Super Ball, which remains their trademark. Superballs are often smaller than a Spaldeen.

== Other bouncy balls ==
Skyball is a brand of hollow medium-sized bouncy ball filled with a mix of helium and compressed air, claimed by the manufacturer to have particularly good bounce characteristics. Nerf balls, introduced in 1970, are also small balls that bounce, but they have a lower coefficient of restitution than a typical bouncy ball. Balls similar in size and composition to Spaldeens, but featuring a plethora of designs (such as a baseball pattern, miniature basketball and soccer ball patterns, and so forth) are offered by many companies. Due to their low cost per unit, bouncy balls with logos or other designs are sometimes used as promotional merchandise. Bouncy balls may, by means of fluorescence, chemiluminescence, or motion-activated LEDs, emit light; such balls are called glow balls. Balls composed of many rubber bands, or bouncy balls made of borax, glue, and cornstarch, are sometimes homemade. Bouncy balls are often used in juggling.

== See also ==
- Physics of a bouncing ball
