= Street game =

Sport or game that is played on city streets

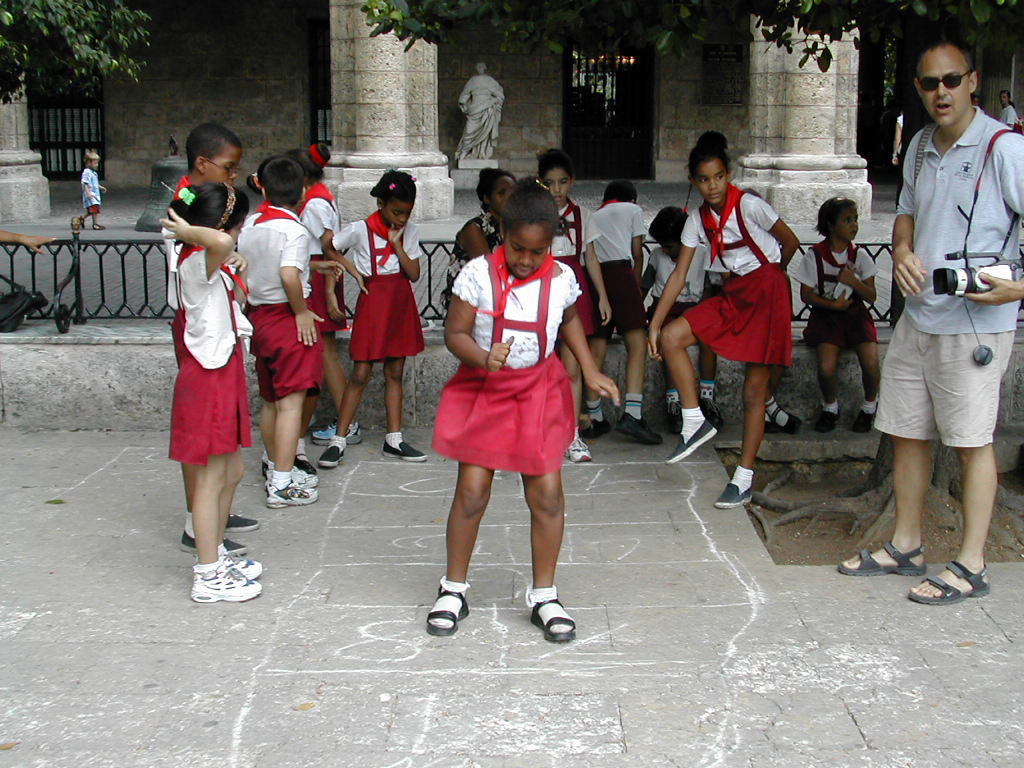
Hopscotch

A street game or street sport is a sport or game that is played on city streets rather than a prepared field. Street games are usually simply play time activities for children in the most convenient venue. Some street games have risen to the level of organized tournaments, such as stickball.

When street games are based on organized sports, the rules are highly modified to fit the situation, i.e. manhole covers for bases with cars or buildings for foul lines in stickball. When balls are used in street games, Spaldeens are often used.

== Street sports ==
Street sports are sports held in urban environments. Street sports are an expression of the spontaneous, improvisational and creative origins of sport adapted by human ingenuity to the urban environment. In historical terms their origins are traceable to the very earliest evidence of sports in Greek and Roman civilisation. Street sports are a hybrid form of sport and reflect the adaptation of conventional sports to the cityscape. Viewing the city through as a living, bustling, and thriving organism helps to cast light on the nature of that which is urban and to begin to home-in on particular salient features of urban life. It is only with the advent of this relatively modern perspective on the urban that it has become possible to speak in terms of street sports.

Parkour artist Sebastien Foucan has defined the sport of Freerunning as a ‘physical art’. In the words of Foucan, street sports are "...a philosophy concerned with the quest of personal and social realisation..." A similar point of view can be found in the notion of the philosophy of urban solo-climbing expounded by Alain Robert. Likewise, the high-wire walker, Philippe Petit, whose performance include walking between the World Trade Center towers in 1974, has described his 'interventions' on the urban environment as 'art crimes', suggesting their essence is creative and constitutes an expression—an interaction with the city.

== Examples of street games ==
This is a list of games that are traditionally played by urban children in playgrounds, parking lots, and back streets. They are all games that may be played on a hard surface, like asphalt. They are part of children's street culture, and are notoriously hard to classify rigorously.

=== Utilizing a rubber ball ===
- American handball
- Backyard cricket (Gully cricket)
- Box baseball
- Baseball5
- Butts Up
- Chinese handball (Ace-King-Queen)
- Four square (Boxball)
- Half-rubber or halfball
- Hit the stick
- Off the wall
- One wall paddleball
- Patball
- Punchball
- Stickball, an urban variant of baseball
- Stoop ball
- Streetball (street basketball)

=== Other games ===
- Buck buck (Johnny on a Pony)
- Clapping games
- Double Dutch
- Hopscotch
- Hurray (game)
- Marbles
- Red Rover
- Ringolevio, a game with two teams that mixes elements of tag with hide-and-seek
- Singing game
- Skipping rope or Skipping
- Skully (a.k.a. skelly, bottlecaps), the "poor man's golf", played with bottlecaps
- Street football
- Street hockey
- String games (cat's cradle)
- Variations of tag
  - Atya-patya
  - Kabaddi
  - Kho-kho
  - Kick the can
  - Langdi
  - Steal the Bacon

== In popular culture ==
- Street sports in the Middle East: The Kite Runner and The Kite Runner (the film adaptation)
- Highwire Walking: Man on Wire, film documenting the background to Petit's high-wire walk between the WTC Towers.
- A 2010 PBS documentary, New York Street Games, shows the best-known street games played in New York City in the twentieth century, as well as discussing the decline of those games in recent decades.

== See also ==
- Children's game
- List of traditional children's games
