= Traditional games of New York City =

The traditional games of New York City are one of the notable aspects of New York City's culture; many of them were brought over by the diverse mix of immigrants that settled in New York City, particularly from Europe. Many of these games used street furniture and other features of New York City's high urban density and were therefore also played in other cities of the United States. Most of these games have declined or disappeared in the modern era.

== History ==
Traditional games historically played a significant role in street life in New York City. During the 1900s, efforts were made to push children away from the dangers of street traffic and towards playing on newly built playgrounds, with the objective of avoiding certain unwanted behaviors (such as spreading glass so that cars couldn't drive on the streets). Another hope was to improve immigrant assimilation, which was considered important during a large wave of immigration to the United States. There were also concerns of children being liable to become criminals or mingle too much with adults. However, racial integration was not pursued as thoroughly; in the 1930s, New York City built 255 playgrounds, only 2 of which were in black neighborhoods. "Play streets" were also implemented, closing off certain streets to allow children to safely play in them.

== Traditional games ==
=== Double Dutch ===
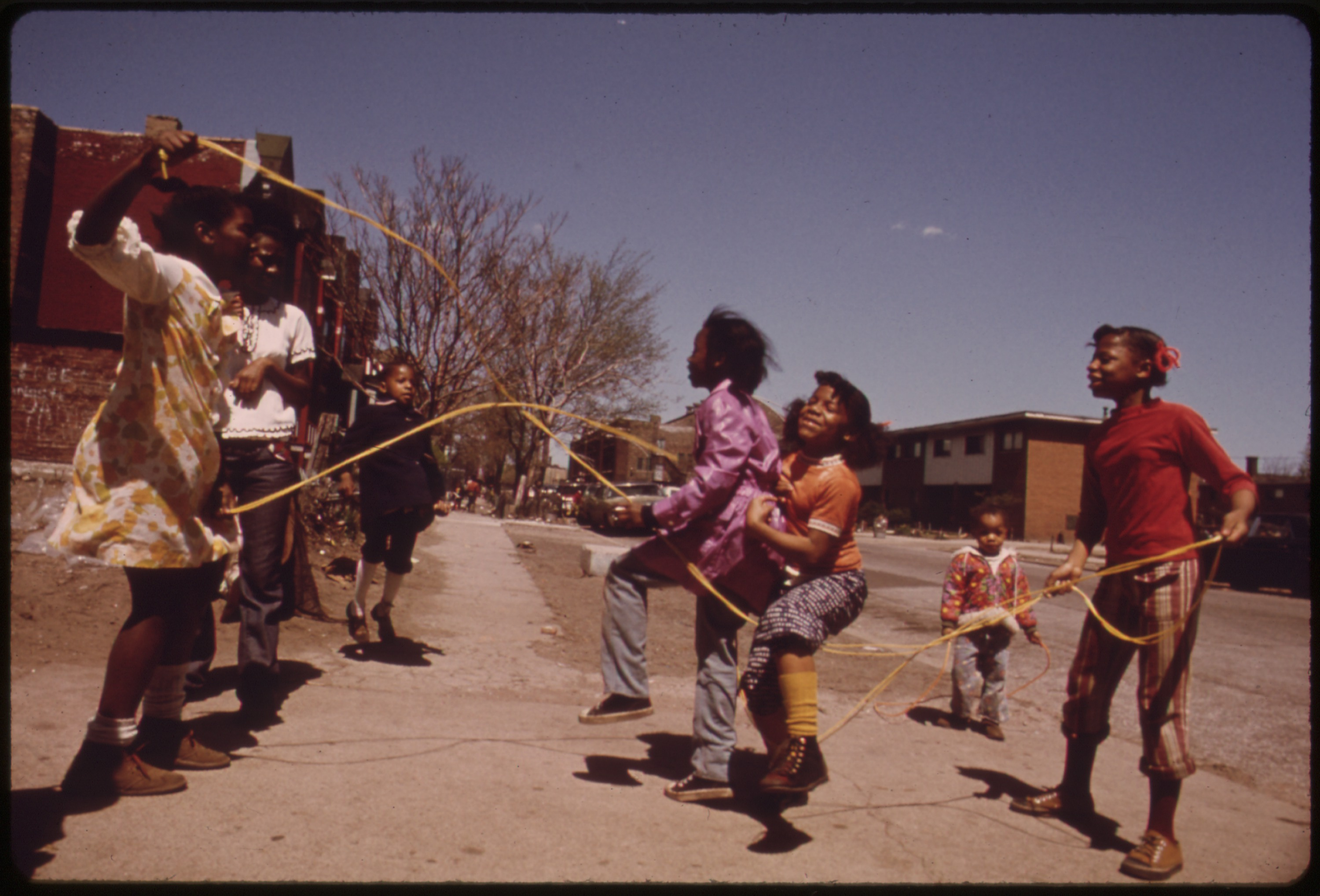
Girls playing Double Dutch outside the Ida B. Wells Homes in Chicago, 1973

Double Dutch is a game in which two long jump ropes turning in opposite directions are jumped by one or more players jumping simultaneously.

It is widely acknowledged that modern Double Dutch originated in the United States among girls in predominantly Black urban communities during the 1940s and 1950s, who congregated on street corners to display new tricks and repurposed clotheslines as ropes. While it had long been a popular street activity for African American girls in New York City, the rules of the sport were formalized in the early 1970s by NYPD officers Ulysses Williams and David Walker. The first official competition was held in 1974. Competitions in Double Dutch range from block parties to the world level. During the spring of 2009, Double Dutch became a varsity sport in New York City public high schools. In the early 1980s, Double Dutch was strongly associated with New York hip hop culture. It has also been recognized as an element of the genre by notable MCs such as KRS-One.

Although it is popularly claimed the activity was brought to America by Dutch settlers, the term "double Dutch" itself has long existed in English slang, where it originally referred to incomprehensible speech or nonsense, reflecting historical English views of the Dutch language as confusing or strange. Phrases such as "in Dutch," meaning to be in trouble, further illustrate this pejorative connotation. The use of the term "double Dutch" for the game reflects the visual complexity and perceived challenge of the jump-roping, similar to the confusion implied by the idiom.

=== Skully ===
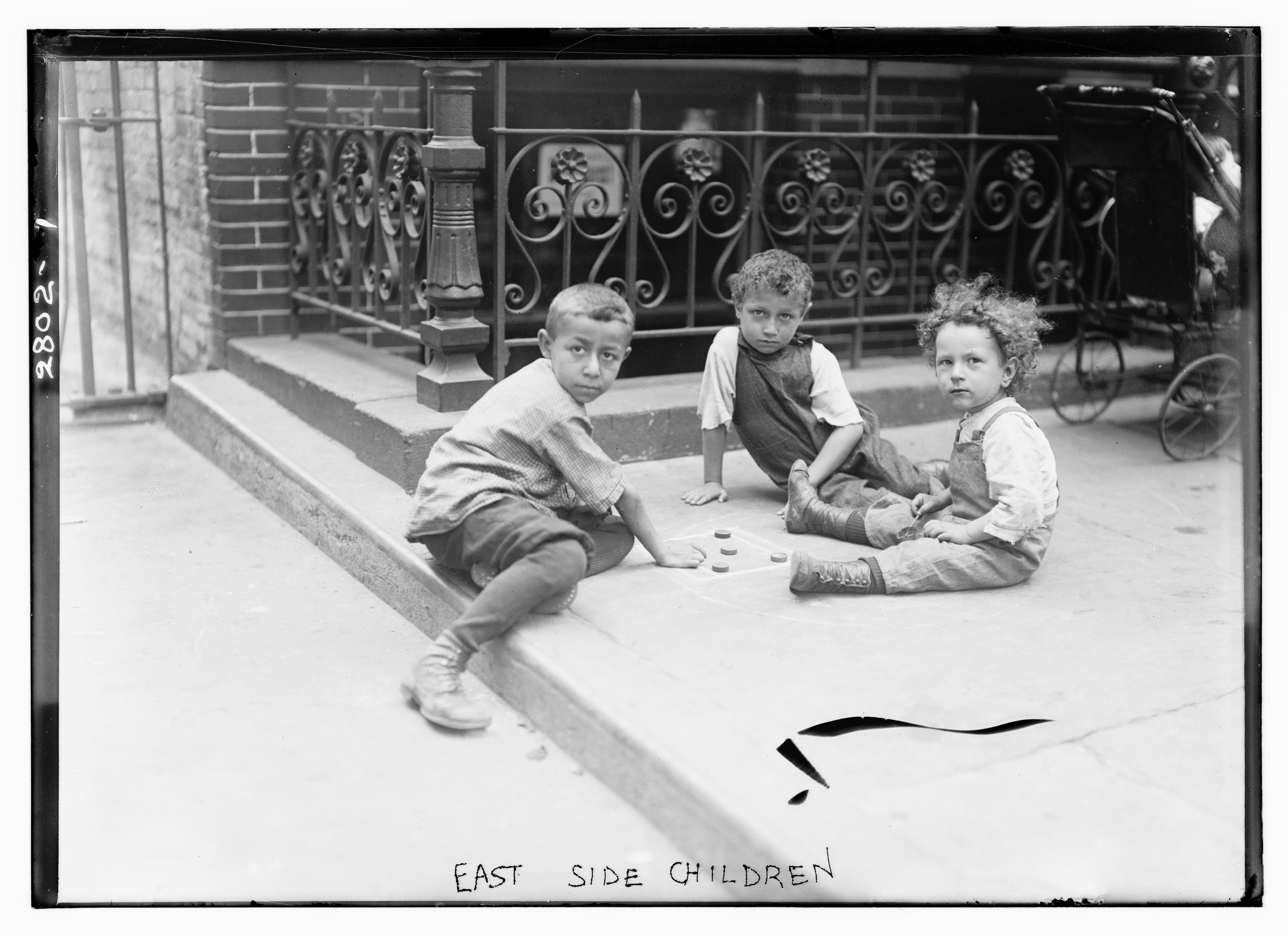
Children playing a skully-type game on Manhattan's East Side, early 1910s.

Skully (also called skelly, skellies, skelsy, skellzies, scully, skelzy, scummy top, tops, loadies or caps) is a children's game played on the streets of New York City and other urban areas. Sketched on the street usually in chalk, a skully board allows a game for two to six players. A sidewalk is sometimes used, offering greater protection from vehicular traffic; however, the asphalt on a typical city street is smoother and provides better game play than a bumpy concrete sidewalk.

=== Chinese handball ===
Chinese handball is a form of American handball popular on the streets of New York City, Philadelphia, and Bridgewater during the 1950s, 1960s, 1970s, and 1980s and still played today, mostly in New York City, Philadelphia, and San Diego. Different variations are played around the world. Its defining feature is that, unlike traditional handball, in Chinese or indirect handball, for a shot to be valid, the ball must hit the ground before it hits the wall. Because it is often played with large or irregular numbers of players, it is considered a more social and accessible alternative to conventional American handball, especially in schoolyard settings.

== Variations of baseball ==
Baseball has historically been one of the most popular sports in New York City, and so several street variations of it appeared over time. Playing street variations of baseball was a way for immigrants to assimilate and join American life without having to spend the money required to participate in regular baseball.

=== Stickball ===
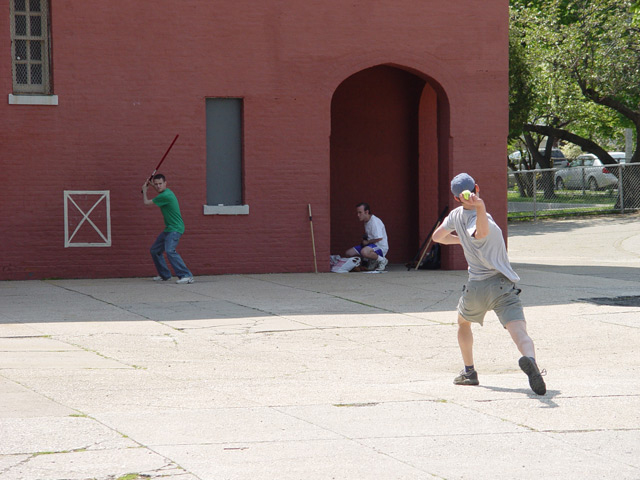
Stickball in New York

Stickball is a street game similar to baseball, usually formed as a pick-up game played in large cities in the Northeastern United States, especially New York City, Philadelphia, and Boston. The equipment consists of a broom handle and a rubber ball, typically a spaldeen, pensy pinky, high bouncer or tennis ball. The rules come from baseball and are modified to fit the situation. For example, a manhole cover may be used as a base, or buildings for foul lines. The game is a variation of bat and ball games dating back to at least the 1750s. This game was widely popular among youths during the 20th century until the 1980s.

=== Punchball ===
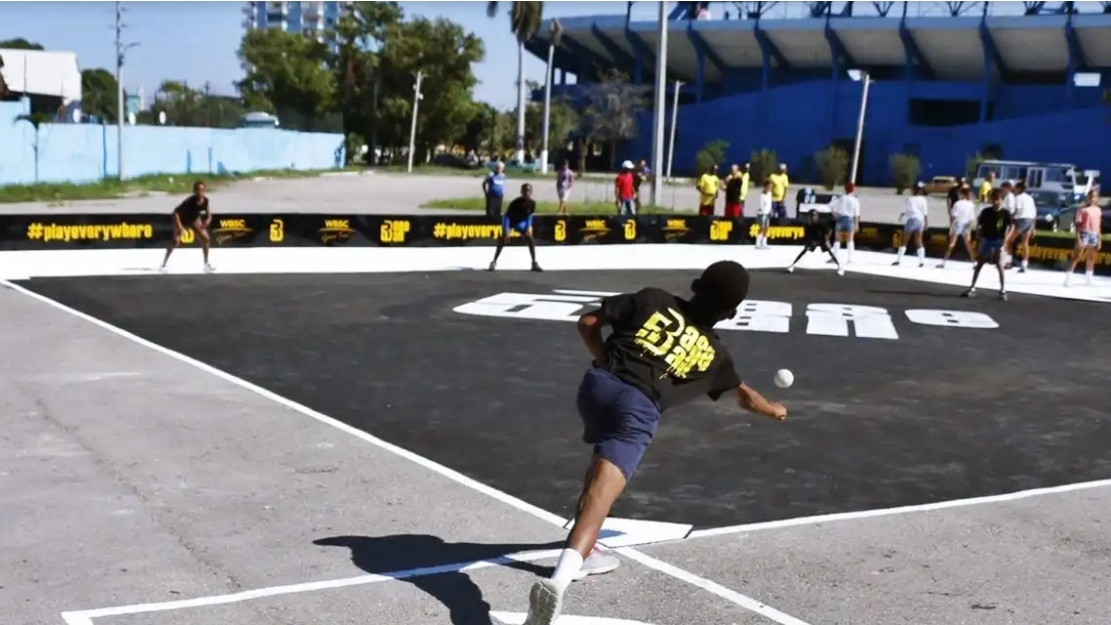
A Baseball5 batter hitting the ball punchball-style

Punchball is a sport spawned by and similar to baseball, but without a pitcher, catcher, or bat.

The "batter" essentially plays "fungo" without a bat, bouncing or tossing up the ball and then using a volleyball type approach to put the ball in play, punching the ball with his fist. The ball was usually a rubber spaldeen or pensie pinkie, but even a tennis ball or wad of taped-up paper can be used. (Note: In some variations of punchball, known as sockball, the ball was either a rolled up sock or a volleyball.) Base stealing, foul balls, and bunting are not allowed.

=== Stoop ball ===
Stoop ball (also spelled "stoopball") is a game that is played by throwing a ball against a stoop (stairs leading up to a building) on the pavement in front of a building. Historically, it has been popular in Brooklyn and other inner cities. In Boston, the game is known as "Up-Against", while in Chicago, the game is known as "Pinners". In Chicago's Bridgeport area the game is called "Three Outs". The game is also known as "Off the Point". It first became popular after World War II.

== Variations of tag ==
=== Ringolevio ===
Ringolevio (also spelled ringalevio or ring-a-levio) is a children's game that originated in the streets of New York City, where it is known to have been played at least as far back as the late 19th century. (Note: Before the first World War, one of the greatest games kids played was Ringolevio. In front of the Grace Church on East 92nd Street and Church Lane, each weeknight we formed a circle of 10 or 12 of us in two teams. The ones who went to hide would then try to sneak back without being caught by one of the guardians of the circle. If a boy managed to get in without being caught, he would yell, "Ringolevio!" and free everyone that had previously been caught. This went on until about 9 p.m. when we had to go home. Denton, John (November 23, 2006). "Playing Ringolevio In Front Of Grace Church". Canarsie Courier. Brooklyn, New York. Archived from the original on September 23, 2015.) It is one of the many variations of tag. In Canada, the game is known as Relievio, a name that was also used in Boston and Ireland in the 1950s. It is also, in some places, known as coco-levio.

== See also ==
- New York Street Games
