= Truce term =

Temporary respite during a game or activity

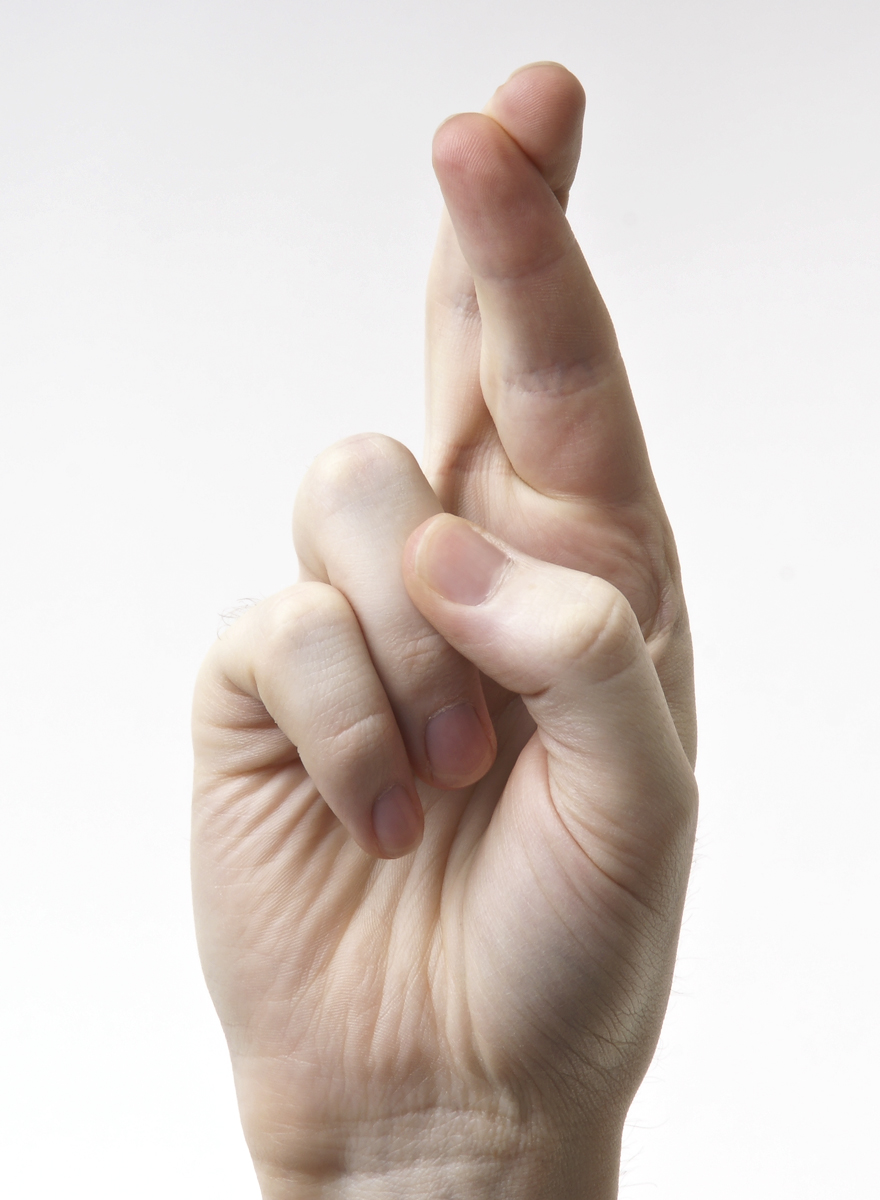
Crossed fingers are a common gesture accompanying truce terms in the UK, New Zealand and the US.

A truce term is a word or short phrase accepted within a community of children as an effective way of calling for a temporary respite or truce during a game or activity, such as tag or its variants. Common examples in English-speaking cultures are barley, fainites, crosses, kings and exe(s) in the United Kingdom, pegs and nibs in New Zealand and variants of barley in Australia. In the United States, terms based on time-out have, from the 1950s onwards, largely supplanted earlier common terms based on kings and exe(s). Since the late 1980s, time-out has been recorded in other English-speaking cultures besides the US. Examples of use of truce terms are if a child has a stitch or wants to raise a point on the rules of the game.

Traditionally, these terms are specific to certain geographical areas, although some may be used by a particular social group, such as pax in the UK (used primarily by children attending private schools). To be functional, a truce term must be understood and honoured by most of the children playing together.

The most extensive study of the use and incidence of these terms is that undertaken by folklorists Iona and Peter Opie in the UK in their 1959 book The Lore and Language of Schoolchildren, which mapped the use of truce terms across England, Wales and Scotland. The Opies considered it the most important word in a schoolchild's vocabulary and one for which there was no adult equivalent. There has been little recent research in the UK, but such research as exists indicates that truce terms, including some of those prevalent in the late 1950s, are still in general use. Studies conducted since the 1970s in English-speaking cultures show that truce terms are also prevalent in Australia, New Zealand, South Africa and the United States, with a number of terms deriving from older terms used in the UK, but many not.

The use of a truce term is usually accompanied by a gesture, such as crossed fingers of one or both hands or the raising of thumbs. In the US, a T-shape made with both hands (representing time-out) has become prevalent and this gesture is also appearing in other countries.

== Use ==
Truce terms are recorded as having been used in the following circumstances: being out of breath, having a stitch, a shoelace being undone, fear of clothes being damaged, needing to go to the lavatory, checking the time, wanting to discuss or clarify rules during a fight or game, or one combatant wanting to remove their spectacles or jacket before continuing. It does not mean to surrender, although it may sometimes be used in preparation to surrendering. Truce terms are only used within a specific age group, have little currency outside that group, and are by and large abandoned by the age of 10 or 11 years. However, research into early recorded use of these terms found examples of some of these terms being used as a sign of surrender in battle or adult fights or quarrels as early as the 18th century.

The vocabulary of children's games, including truce terms, is described by sociolinguist Peter Trudgill in Dialects of England as being particularly rich in regional variation insofar as it is not based on official or television culture. They are an example of the subculture of young children which is transmitted by word of mouth.

== United Kingdom ==
=== Opie study ===
The Opies conducted a study of the use of truce terms throughout England, Scotland and Wales in the 1950s and published their results in a book called The Lore and Language of Schoolchildren. They found truce terms varied according to geographical location, with the exception of pax. In some places, more than one term was current, and often four or five were known, although usually only one term predominated. Schools bordering two linguistic regions honoured both. The words used in urban areas were often at odds with words used in the surrounding countryside. The Opies recorded around 45 truce terms plus variations. The most widely used were barley, fainites, kings, crosses, keys, skinch, cree and scribs.

Barley was recorded by the Opies as the prevailing term in east Scotland and the Borders, the Lake District, north-west England, west Midlands and in Wales, apart from the south-east of Wales where cree prevailed. There were many variations such as barley-bay, barley-bees, barlow or barrels. The use of barlay as a truce term appears in the 14th-century poem Sir Gawayne and the Grene Knight and Tobias Smollett's The Reprisal. It is recorded in lexicographer John Jamieson's 1808 Etymological Dictionary of the Scottish Language as a term specifically used by children to demand truce. A probable variation also appears in the 1568 manuscript Chrysts-Kirk of the Grene, sometimes attributed to James I of Scotland, as follows:

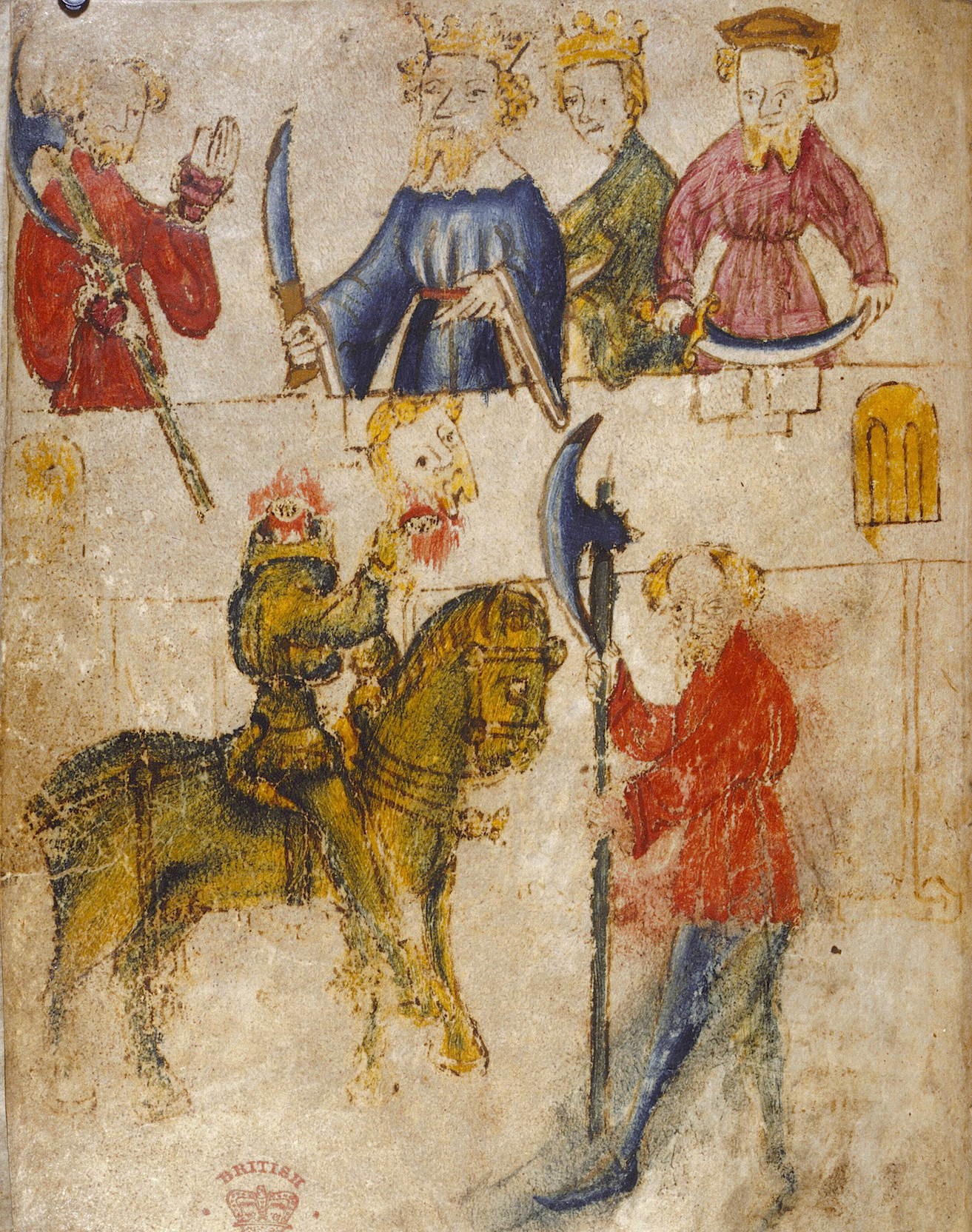
Mediaeval illumination of Sir Gawain and the Green Knight

Thocht he was wicht, he was nocht wyss,

With sic Jangleurs to jummill;

For frae his Thoume they dang a Sklyss,

Quhyle he cry'd Barlafummill.

The "Thoume" (thumb) that is "sklyss" (sliced) in the quote above may refer to the thumb having been raised by the man calling barlafummill, a common accompanying gesture to the use of a truce term in Scotland.

Fainites and fains (or vainites and vains) predominated in London and throughout southern England, apart from the scribs and screams of east Hampshire, and extended north as far as Olney in Buckinghamshire. Variations included fennits, fannies, fainsies, faylines, vainlights and vainyards. Notes and Queries reported in 1870 that fains was in common use by London schoolboys. Faints appeared in an 1889 dictionary of slang and fainits in 1891. According to philologist J. R. R. Tolkien, the term derives from the medieval term fein I, descended in turn from the Old French se feindre meaning "to make excuses, hang back or back out of battle". He also proposes that this use of the term throws light on line 529 of the Clerk's Tale by Chaucer that "lordes heestes mowe nat been yfeyned" (the lords orders cannot be treated with a fain I; in other words, declined). Another translation of the Anglo-Norman word feindre is "pretend, feign, turn a blind eye to", which is what the more powerful child does whilst granting respite.

Spoken English south of the Danelaw became, from at least the 11th century onwards, characterised by a pronunciation known as Southern Voicing, such as vrog for frog, or zummer for summer. Vainites or vains, variants of fainites or fains, are surviving examples of this on the borders of the Danelaw to the north of London. Other truce terms prevail within the Danelaw.

Kings was recorded by the Opies as common in eastern England. The English Dialect Dictionary recorded much the same in the nineteenth century. The earliest recorded instance the Opies found was in Sternberg's 1851 Dialect of Northamptonshire. Queens is recorded as used in the kings area, sometimes as an alternative and sometimes as indicating readiness to restart the game. Kings truce is found in Thomas Dekker's The Honest Whore, Part One (II,i), which appeared in 1604. The term is used in the play to halt a quarrel.

Crosses, cruces, creases and cree were found in a broad band across England from crosses in Lincolnshire, cruce or cruces from Oxford through to Gloucester, creases in Berkshire and cree in South Wales and both sides of the Bristol Channel. There are some areas of scruces, screwsies or screws in Essex and Suffolk. The Opies saw creases as a transitional word.

Exes, used around Ipswich and Norwich, was thought to be a variant of crosses.

Bars and sometimes barsies were common in Devon in an otherwise predominantly fainites area. Bar was used the other side of the Bristol channel in Swansea.

Skinch or skinge predominated in Northumberland and Durham, another term first recorded in a nineteenth-century dialect dictionary.

Keys was found by the Opies to be the prevailing term in western Scotland and in a strip running through north-west England in an otherwise predominantly barley area.

Scribs or squibs covered an area from Hampshire to West Sussex and Surrey. Other Hampshire variants were scrims, screens, scrames, screams, creams and cribs.

Finns was used in Guernsey.

Pax, (Latin for 'peace'), was a group dialect word rather than a regional one as it was predominantly used in private schools and school stories.

Many individual cities, towns and rural districts had their own words not used elsewhere, such as bees, blobs, croggies, denny, keppies, locks, peas, peril, nix, truce, snakes and twigs.

Certainly, the term fainlights (with crossed fingers of one hand) was used in parts of East London in the 1950s, whereas vainlights was a truce term of the same period in parts of Surrey.

=== Post-Opie studies ===
A study undertaken in Lincolnshire in 1974 confirmed the Opies' findings. However, a later study undertaken in Croydon, Surrey, in 1988 found the use of truce terms much less uniform. Croydon is firmly in the fainites area on the Opies' map, but in 1988, fainites was only the third most commonly used term. The most common terms were pax (30%), jecs (25%), fainites (20%) and cross keys (2%). Jecs is a term not recorded by the Opies at all and there was some evidence that it derived from the word injection. Fainites was known more than it was used and was reported by one teacher to be "totally lacking in street credibility". Pax was no longer a group word as reported by the Opies. Other terms reported included pips, force field and quits. The authors concluded that either the Opies had grossly oversimplified the picture or things had radically changed in 30 years (some seven to eight generations of primary school children). They also noted that although some schools reported a marked preference for a particular term, all schools reported at least some children using different terms.

The Concise Scots Language Dictionary, published in 1999, records the use of keys as a truce term in Fife, south-west and west central Scotland.

== Australia ==
According to researchers from the National Australian Dictionary Centre, there is evidence that barley (Scotland and the west of England), barlies (Aberdeen and a few English towns), bar (Swansea) and bars (Devon), are used in Australia. In Australia, the terms are used regionally with Victorians using barley, New South Welshmen using bar or bars and the people of Western Australia using barlies.

== Ireland ==
In Ireland, "pax" is a common truce term, sometimes corrupted to "tax." In Irish, the word síocháin ("peace") or méaram (perhaps from méar, "finger") is used.

== New Zealand ==
A study undertaken between 1999 and 2001 in New Zealand by lexicographers Laurie and Winifred Bauer on traditional forms of play included truce terms. The terms they described in their study were regional and the most common were pegs (widespread), twigs (Taranaki), gates (Auckland), tags (Nelson Marlborough), and nibs (Otago-Southland). In Wellington schools, the dominant term was fans, recorded in New Zealand before 1920, which the authors state derives from fains or fain it as described by the Opies, itself dating back to Chaucerian times. The most widespread term was pegs, derived from pax. Apparently unrecorded before World War II, this appears to have first changed to pags, probably from being shouted out at length, and then further mutated by virtue of broad New Zealand accents to pegs. The Bauers thought the most likely hypothesis for the use of this rather upper-class term from the UK was that it derived from books and stories about UK public schools. Similarly, they thought nibs derived from nix, possibly via nigs, originally from South Africa, though unknown to the Opies save for a very small area of nicks possibly from nicklas. Nix is also UK public school slang, though not as a truce term. Nixs and flix were recorded as having been described by a South African boy as prevalent in South Africa, and were thought by a South African linguist to have derived from an Afrikaans term.

Many of the common truce terms recorded by the Bauers such as bags, poison, gates, tags, flicks, are not listed by the Opies, although they speculated that both bags and tags may derive from pax.

== United States ==
In a study undertaken by historians Mary and Herbert Knapp in the 1970s, informants remembering terms from the 1930s reported kings X and kings. The use of kings X before the 1930s is well-recorded. The 1985 edition of the Dictionary of American Regional English records the historical use of kings ex, kings sax, kings cruse, kings excuse and kings, chiefly west of the Mississippi River, the Gulf States and Ohio Valley. The earliest recorded use cited in the dictionary is of kings cruse in 1778 during an adult fight.

Scholarly speculation in the late nineteenth century postulated that kings X derived from kings truce, rendered as kings cruse and then kings excuse, becoming kings X as a shortened form. The Dictionary of American Regional English cites the Opies as a source for the derivation of the terms and states that exes probably refers to the use of crossed fingers, an important part of the demand for a truce, rather than deriving from "excuse" as originally thought. However, the Knapps state that although the Opies do not record kings X as such in the UK, they do record kings, crosses, exes, cruse and truce. They conclude that kings X derived from the users of kings and exes settling in the same areas of the US—the terms were then combined and shortened. Kings cruse, once popular in the US, might be accounted for in a similar manner. Barley has been recorded as a truce term in Ohio, Wisconsin, and Virginia.

The Knapps study in Monroe County, Indiana, found time-out and times to be by far the most prevalent terms in the 1970s. Variations included I've got times and time. Very few children reported the more traditional kings, queens or I've got kings X. The authors also reported that these terms were popular over many areas of the US and in American schools abroad. To be functional, a truce term must be understood and honoured by most of the children playing together. Time-out clearly derives from the use of intermissions in timed sports and apparently came into the language with the popularization of organized or timed sports and with the advent of such sports in elementary schools and on television. Historically, the earliest reports for the use of time-out or time as a truce term were 1935 and 1936. However, only a small number of respondents reported anything other than time-out and its derivatives in use during the 1960s. The few alternatives included pax, safe, base or home-base and freeze with one small area of fins (Mount Vernon). The Knapps reported that time-out had, since the 1950s, supplanted kings ex as the most popular truce term.

The use of times rather than time-out and I've got times rather than I call time appears to have been influenced by older forms such as kings and I've got kings X. There was also one report of times X. Similarly derivatives of time-out are often accompanied by the traditional crossed fingers.

== France ==
In France, children use the word pouce as the equivalent of the English pax and the American time-out. The literal translation of pouce is thumb or big toe. "Lu !" is—or was—a common truce term in Châteauroux, central France, in the fifties and sixties. The word pouce is also popular with children in Israel.

== Gestures ==
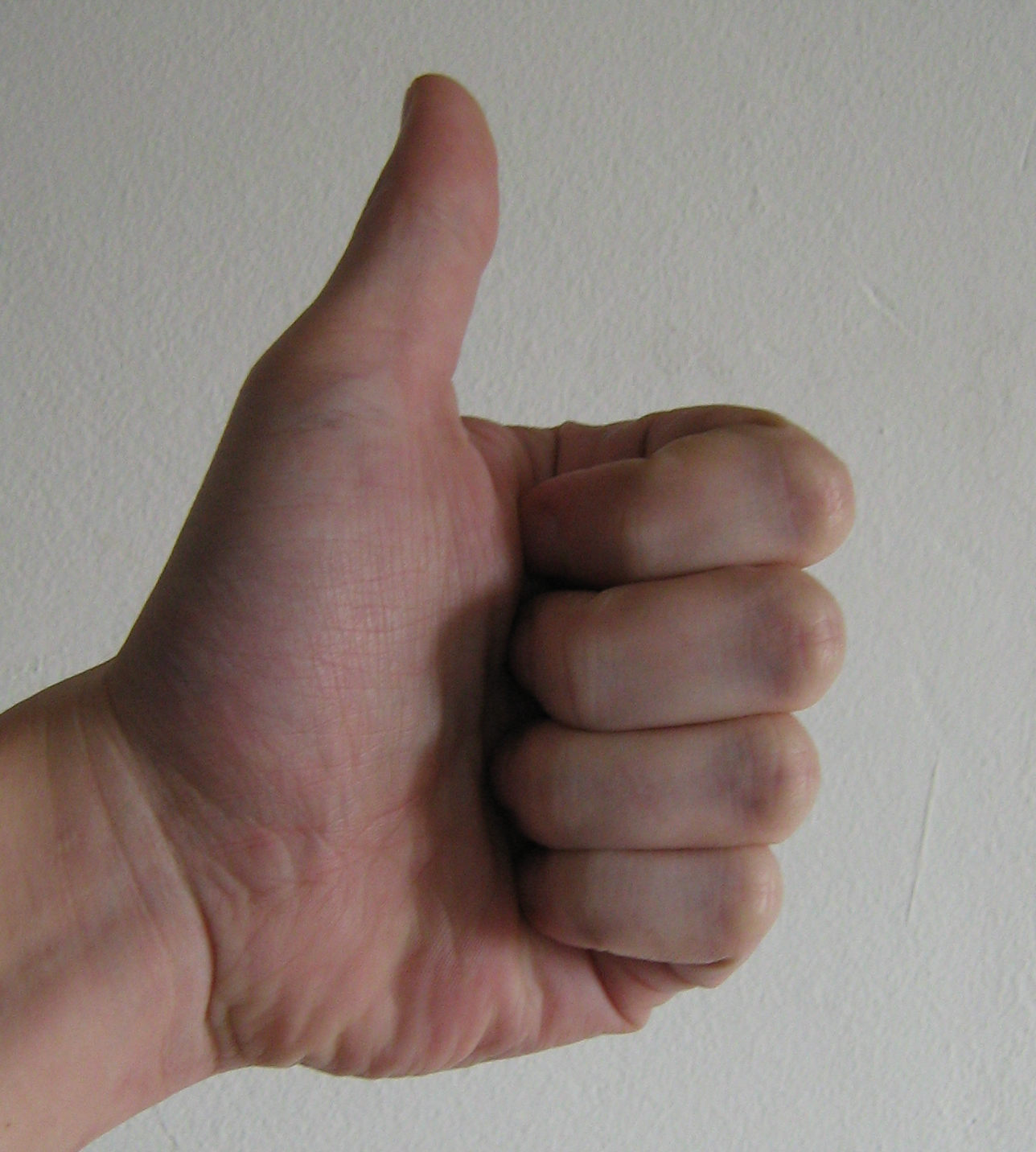
In Scotland and France, children hold up one or both thumbs

The Opies found that in England and Wales, children usually held up crossed fingers. Sometimes crossing the fingers of both hands was required and occasionally the feet as well. The Opies found one area, Headington, where sitting cross-legged was required. At Lydney, children could raise their right hand palm forward, whilst in Bradford-on-Avon, the hand was held up with three fingers extended. In some parts of Scotland, the custom was to put up one's thumbs, sometimes licking them first. This also occurred in a few places in Lancashire. Anecdotally, the raising of a thumb may also accompany the use of pouce in France.

The 1988 Croydon study found a variety of gestures in common use. These were crossed fingers of one hand (44%), crossed fingers of both hands (26%), thumbs through fingers (6%) (boys only) and arms crossed across the chest (2%). Other gestures, reported in ones and twos, included miming an injection into the arm, licking the thumb, making a T-shape with the hands, three fingers held up and the "Vulcan" sign from Star Trek. Virtually all schools reported the use of crossed fingers.

The holding up of one hand with middle and index fingers crossed was the usual gesture found in New Zealand in 1999–2001. The T-shape was also used when saying time-out. The time-out gesture is made with two hands – one hand held horizontally, palm down, the other hand vertically with the fingertips touching the bottom of the horizontal hand. In the US, although the more modern time-out has largely supplanted traditional terms, often accompanied by the time-out gesture, the crossed fingers gesture remains common.

== See also ==
- Iona and Peter Opie
- Olly olly oxen free
- Children's street culture
- Folkloristics
