= Peeka =

Peeka may refer to:

- PK machine gun, a machine gun from the former Soviet Union
- Peeka (game), a game similar to Hide-and-seek played between Cheebies and Piplings in the children's TV series Waybuloo
