= Childhood secret club =

Informal organization by kids

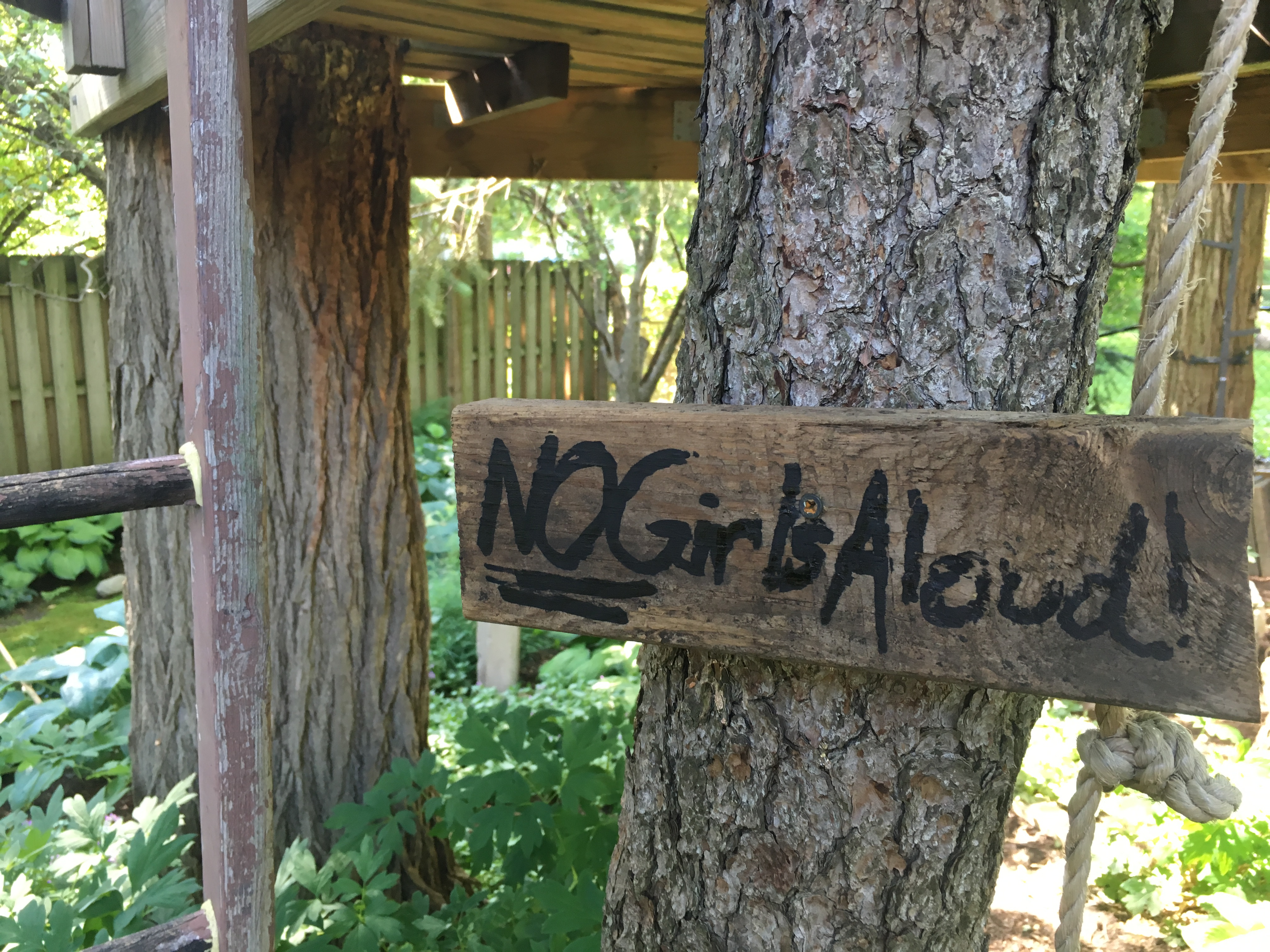
A keep out sign on a child's treehouse, saying that no girls are allowed there

A Childhood Secret Club is an informal organization created by children.

== Key elements ==
Some common features of a childhood secret club may include:

Names: Unlike cliques, these associations often have names. These younger groups don't have the social competition that adolescent cliques do, or the level of bad behaviour that street gangs have. However, in rare instances there may be rivalry with other such groups around the same age, which can lead to physical fights between them.

Peer leadership: Unlike group activities like Scouting, which are led by adults, these groups are led by children.

Pro forma secrecy: The secrecy may be more imaginary than real. For instance the name of the club (if it has one) and its membership are usually obvious to all. There may be a desire to create secret codes and plans, but they are rarely implemented. A ramshackle den, tree house, clubhouse, fort, or "secret base" may be built in nearby scrub-land or an abandoned building. Some children in a secret club may use a part of the grounds of the school they attend together as their "base" during periods of recess.

Single-sex membership: Such clubs are usually either all boys or all girls but not mixed but exceptions do occur. There may be a sense of competition between the genders, as well as independence from adult authority.

Catch-phrase/greetings/secret words: Sometimes the clubs develop one or more secret catch-phrases (sometimes nonsensical words) and greetings. This is illustrated in the 1982 film P'tang, Yang, Kipperbang.

== Their status ==
Many schools have rules against secret clubs, and some jurisdictions even have laws prohibiting secret or invitation-only societies in public elementary or secondary schools.

The fact that interest in these clubs tends to be a passing phase at a certain age may result from the stages of children's cognitive development. After growing out of the "egocentric", or "preoperational" stage, reaching the "age of reason", one is able to understand other people's intentions. The next step is the ability to understand groups and the desire to belong to a club.

Written material about these secret clubs, such as the external links listed below, cites eight- and nine-year-olds most often. While slightly older children may also participate in secret clubs, they would be less expected to use fantasy elements in their activities.

Juvenile comics and literature often feature such clubs as a plot device, often with spy or detective themes, and often far more organized than their real-life counterparts. A more realistic depiction is found in Zilpha Keatley Snyder's novel The Egypt Game, in which six children gather in an abandoned storage yard to enact fantasy adventures and recreate actual ceremonies based on and adapted from their knowledge of ancient Egypt.

Movies have featured such clubs, notably the early Ealing comedy-thriller Hue & Cry. There are also juvenile non-fiction books that serve as "how-to's" for code-making and surveillance, most notably the Usborne Good Spy Guide series.

== See also ==
- Calvin and Hobbes - have a secret club called G.R.O.S.S. (Get Rid Of Slimy girlS.)
- Children's street culture
- Gossip
- Paracosm (fantasy world)
- Secret society
- The Goonies
- Enid Blyton - author of numerous novels for children, featuring clubs and fantasy elements
