= Hurray (game) =

Bulgarian children's game

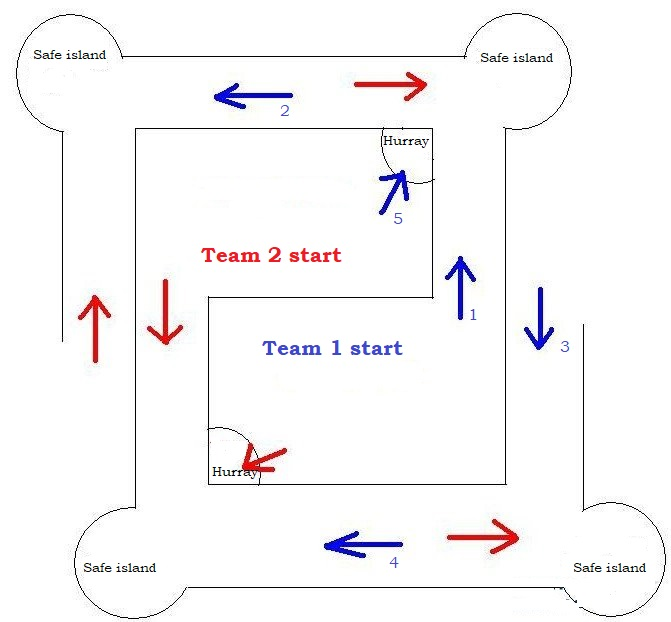
Hurray drawing

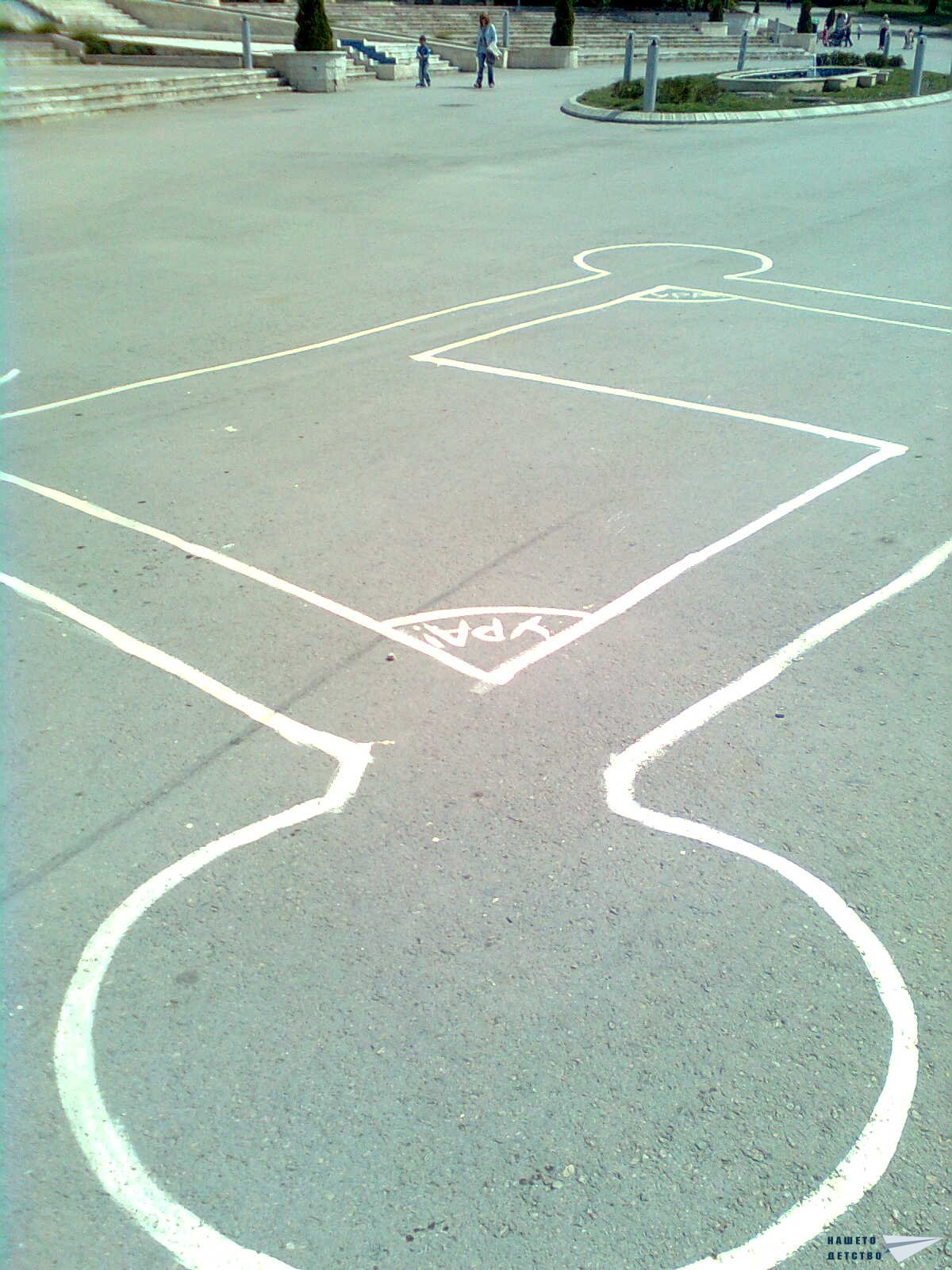
Hurray field in Varna

Hurray (also called Boom) is a late 1970s Bulgarian children's game. Hurray is a street game, usually played outside on an asphalt surface. The game gained mass popularity in the late 1980s, with many streets and car parks appearing in the game's drawing from oil paintings or chalk.

== Rules ==
Hurray involves two teams with an undetermined but equal number of players, located in field one and field two. The goal is for each team to get out of their field, through the corridor, outside their field, enter the other team's field by passing through the corridor and step on the triangle, situated on the far corner of the field, shouting "Hurrah".

As the player passes through the corridors, he is not allowed to step on or out of the drawing because he will be "burned" (taken out of the game). Players from the opposing team - from their field or already out of the drawing - can pull or push players to make a line or go out of the drawing.

When a player is in an angle circle called a "bomb", no one can pull or push him. Out-of-the-field players from the opposing teams can not push each other inside the corner.
