= Hue and Cry (film) =

- Original UK quad format film poster
- Directed by: Charles Crichton
- Written by: T. E. B. Clarke
- Produced by: Michael Balcon
- Starring: Alastair Sim; Harry Fowler; Jack Warner
- Cinematography: Douglas Slocombe
- Edited by: Charles Hasse
- Music by: Georges Auric
- Production company: Ealing Studios
- Distributed by: GFD (UK); Eagle-Lion Films (US)
- Release date: 23 February 1947 (UK)
- Running time: 82 minutes
- Country: United Kingdom
- Language: English
- Budget: £104,222
- Box office: £96,812 (UK)

Hue and Cry is a 1947 British film directed by Charles Crichton and starring Alastair Sim, Harry Fowler and Joan Dowling. It was written by T. E. B. Clarke.

It is generally considered to be the first of the Ealing comedies.. Shot almost entirely on location in London still showing the damage of the Second World War, the city forms the backdrop of a gangster plot which revolves around a working class children's street culture and children's secret clubs.

== Plot ==
In a bombed-out post-war London neighbourhood, British boys' magazines with illustrated adventure stories are a guilty reading pleasure for members of a teen-age clique, the Blood and Thunder Boys. But their leader, Joe Kirby, discovers the plotlines of the popular publication are being copied by a crew of local thieves to plan and execute their jobs. Joe notifies C.I.D. Inspector Ford, who scoffs at the notion with humour. Then while at work, Joe tells his boss, Mr. Nightingale, who suggests Joe forget it. Not to be dissuaded, Joe and another boy visit the stories' eccentric author, Felix Wilkinson. While there, they note that Wilkinson's wording is being altered somewhere between drafting and publication. This leads Joe and his gang on the trail of a female employee of the stories' publishing house. They confront her at a handsome suburban home in Hampstead, but their interrogation gets the boys nowhere. Eventually though, they pinpoint the drop location for the robbers' loot.

Joe and the gang arrange with the author, Wilkinson, to create a new adventure story, designed to send all the criminals to the drop. Next day, Joe tells his boss, Nightingale, of their plan, but Joe realizes afterwards that Nightingale is the mastermind behind the local crimes. Later at the warehouse where the stolen loot is kept, Joe comes upon a cache of stolen fur coats. Nightingale suddenly appears and threatens Joe, but confusion results when other crooks and toughs arrive on the scene. In the melee, Nightingale is temporarily knocked unconscious. The crooks are then overrun by hundreds of city boys who respond to an arranged radio plea for help. Pandemonium and comedy rule the scene. Before long, the police arrive to restore order. Meanwhile, Joe trails Nightingale to a bombed multi-storied building. A showdown between the two follows. It ends when Nightingale falls through one of the many holes in the floor.

== Cast ==
- Alastair Sim as Felix H. Wilkinson
- Harry Fowler as Joe Kirby
- Douglas Barr as Alec
- Joan Dowling as Clarry
- Jack Warner as Nightingale
- Valerie White as Rhona Davis
- Jack Lambert as Ford
- Ian Dawson as Norman
- Gerald Fox as Dicky
- David Simpson as Arthur
- Albert Hughes as Wally
- John Hudson as Stan
- David Knox as Dusty
- Jeffrey Sirett as Bill
- James Crabbe as Terry
- Stanley Escane as Roy
- Frederick Piper as Mr. Kirby
- Vida Hope as Mrs. Kirby
- Heather Delaine as Dorrie Kirby
- Joe E. Carr as short, nattily-dressed thug
- Henry Purvis as Larry the Bull
- Paul Demel as Jago
- Alec Finter as Detective Sergeant Fothergill
- Arthur Denton as vicar
- Robin Hughes as Selwyn Pike
- Howard Douglas as watchman
- Bruce Belfrage as BBC announcer
- Grace Arnold as Dicky's Mother

== Release ==
On 23 February 1947, the film opened at the Tivoli cinema on the Strand in London.

== Reception ==
=== Box office ===
According to trade papers, the film was a "notable box office attraction" at British cinemas in 1947.

The film earned distributor's gross receipts of £96,812 in the UK, £87,796 of which went to the producer.

=== Critical ===
The Monthly Film Bulletin wrote: "This is quite definitely a film out of the ordinary. The story is well constructed, the continuity good and the interest sustained. Good use is made of light and shadow; and the photography is really beautiful. If you want to see the stark reality of bombed sites and buildings this is the film to see. The fight with the cops in the shop is amusing, the trip through the sewers interesting, though it is not usual to plunge through bilge in bare legs, and the final conglomeration of boys worthy of Rene Clair. This is a film about London life, the London of the postwar period, traffic in places you know, Covent Garden, the Embankment, Piccadilly Circus, the Docks, the Market, ruins, open spaces, suburban London. There's life, humour, youth and gaiety, and it is English to the backbone."

Kine Weekly wrote: "Disarmingly ingenuous juvenile adventure comedy melodrama, neatly unfolded in one of London's most heavily blitzed areas. ... Harry Fowler is excellent as the boy hero, and he and the other youngsters set such a hot pace that the old-timers have all their work cut out to follow. It is definitely a triumph of youth over experience. Very good British East Side Kids."

Variety wrote: "Reminiscent of the German classic 'Emil and the Detective' (UFA, 1931), this film has neither its charm nor its wit. The stars, presumably the boxoffice magnets, have been woefully wasted, particularly Valerie White, uncommonly uncomfortable in an unsuitable part. Alastair Sim and Jack Warner, both with considerable followings in this country, will disappoint their public. Lack of youthful charm and spontaneity, accents that will puzzle are major failings. Principal actor is ex-news vendor Harry Fowler, who has played various cockney parts on the screen, but who fails to make the main character credible. And everything depends on believing in him."

== Restoration ==
The film was digitally restored and released on Blu-ray and DVD in 2015.
