= Olly olly oxen free =

Catchphrase used in children's games

"Olly olly oxen free" (spoken aloud) is a catchphrase or truce term used in children's games such as hide and seek, capture the flag, and kick the can, to indicate that players who are hiding can come out into the open without losing the game or that the position of the sides in a game has changed (as in which side is on the field or which side is at bat or "up" in baseball or kickball); alternatively, that the game is entirely over.

The origin of the phrase is unknown. The Dictionary of American Regional English says the phrase may be derived from all ye, all ye outs in free, all the outs in free, or possibly ”calling all the outs in free”; in other words, all who are out may come in without penalty. Others speculate the phrase may be a corruption of a hypothetical and ungrammatical German phrase alle, alle, auch sind frei (all, all, also are free).

A number of variations exist. "Ollyoxalls" is one such variant, said to be used in Portsmouth, England. Another variant is "Ollie Ollie in come free."

== In popular culture ==
In Dobie Gillis's Season 4 episode "Where Is Thy Sting?", 87-year-old incidental character Shorty Eggleston exclaims, "Olly-olly-oxen, free-free-free!" before playing kick the can with Maynard G. Krebs.

== See also ==
- Truce term
