= Sepak Tekong =

Traditional children's game from Indonesia

- Other names: Pak Tekong; Sipak Tekong
- Years active: c.1960–present
- Players: 3–10
- Skills: Running, hiding, seeking

Sepak Tekong is a traditional children's game from Padang, West Sumatra, Indonesia similar in play to hide-and-seek. It is played in many regions around Indonesia. The name comes from the Minangkabau language. The word sepak means menendang or menyepak in Indonesian, which roughly translates to "kick" in English; and tekong means kaleng in Indonesian, which translates to the word "can" in English. Sepak Tekong therefore roughly translates to "kicking the can" in English.

While almost sounding similar, Sepak Tekong is a different game from Sepak Takraw, a professional competitive sport played over a net with rattan ball.

== How to play ==
Sepak Tekong is a game usually played by children around eight years of age and above. The ideal number of players is between three and ten people and it is normally played in a house or yard that has various places to hide. Players use either a coconut shell or a small milk can filled with sand as the can. It is essential that the can makes a loud sound when kicked.

Before the game starts, the first player selects the best place to set the can and chooses the boundaries of where other players can hide. A lottery, called hompimpa, decides who will be the player that guards the can and seeks the players.

To start the game, all of the children, including the guard and seeker, stand near the can. One player kicks the can as far as possible and then all the players, except the guard and seeker, go into hiding. The guard and seeker sits on the can with eyes closed until everyone else has hidden and called out "ready". The guard and seeker then begins searching for the hidden players. When the guard and seeker finds a hidden player, the guard and seeker says the hider's name. The hider and the guard and seeker race to the can. If the guard and seeker gets to the can first, the hider is declared caught and the guard and seeker continues to look for players that are hiding. If the guard and seeker leaves the can to search and a hider emerges and kicks the can, the players who were caught earlier can hide again.

== Benefits ==
Some argue that Sepak Tekong has many benefits for its players:

- promotes physical activity
- builds good relationships among players since all players are considered equal
- improves memory because the guard and seeker must memorize the names of the other players
- promotes creativity because players must find a place to hide and consider whether the place can be easily found or not
- builds community since all players must follow the same rules
- encourages cooperation because rules can be changed to accommodate different geography
- forms good sportsmanship since there are winners and losers

== Decline ==
Younger generations no longer play traditional games like Sepak Tekong. There are many modern games which are considered simpler and easier to play. Only a few children still know and play this Sepak Tekong today. In addition, Sepak Tekong requires a large space to play and it is difficult to find large spaces because most of the possible playing areas are under construction or have been built upon. In this era, most children do not feel that the game is relevant.
