= Skully (game) =

Children's street game

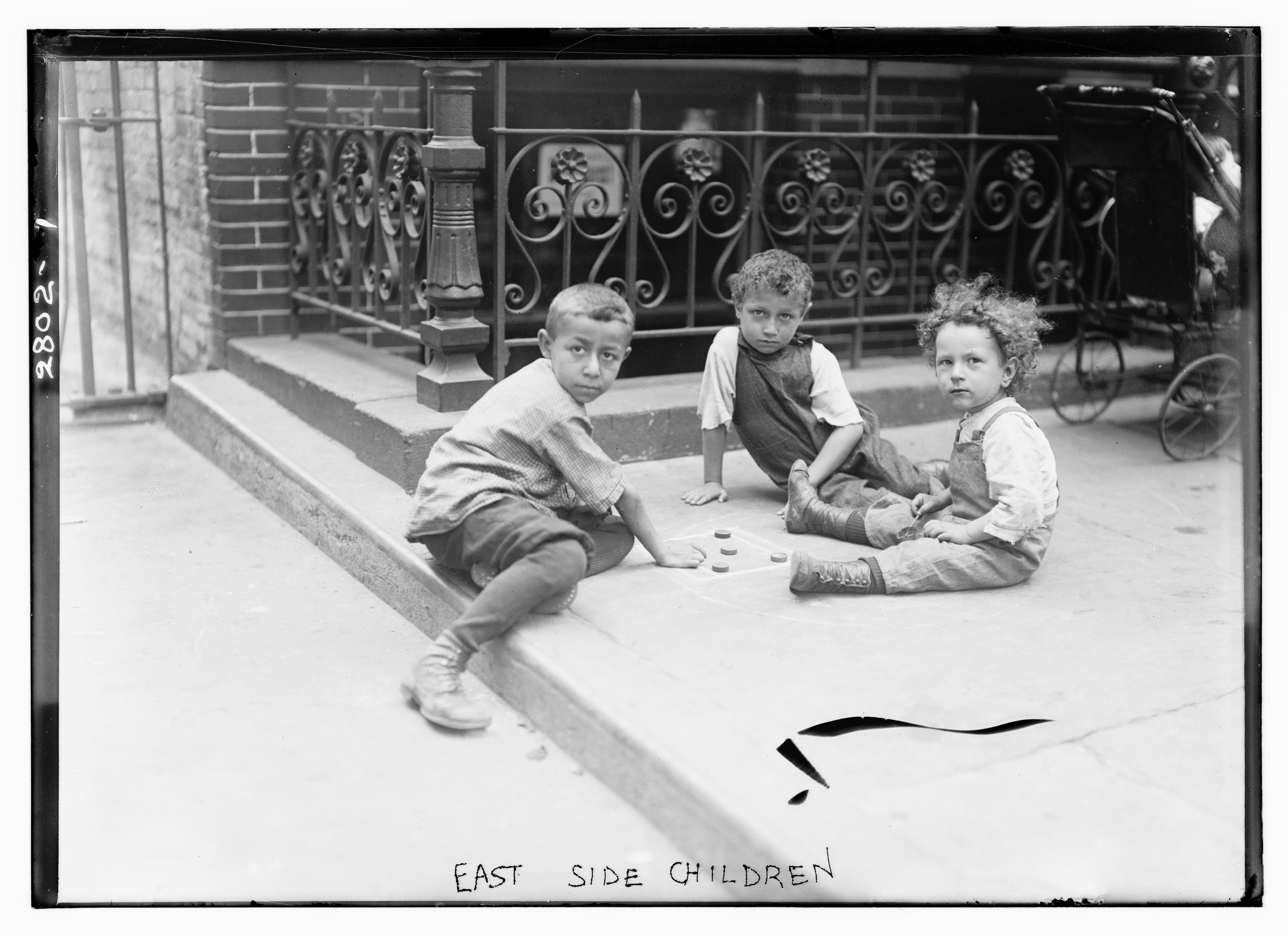
Children playing a skully-type game on Manhattan's East Side, early 1910s.

Skully (also called skelly, skellies, skelsy, skellzies, scully, skelzy, scummy top, tops, loadies or caps) is a children's game played on the streets of New York City and other urban areas. Sketched on the street usually in chalk, a skully board allows a game for two to six players. A sidewalk is sometimes used, offering greater protection from vehicular traffic; however, the asphalt on a typical city street is smoother and provides better game play than a bumpy concrete sidewalk.

Game time varies, but a match of two to three players is usually completed in 20 minutes. Local variations in rules are common and make it difficult to document the game. Rule variations are agreed upon by players before starting a game, especially when players from different neighborhoods play against each other.

== The skully board ==
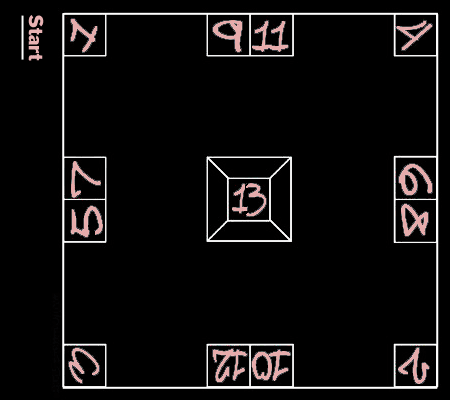
Typical skully board as found in New York City

The skully field of play, or board, is a large square approximately six feet (2 m) a side. This board is drawn on a flat surface, such as the pavement of a street or playground.

At each corner and along the edges of the board are drawn 12 smaller squares, called boxes, of about six inches (15 cm) a side each (see diagram). These boxes are labeled "1" to "12" in a pattern so that the path from one square to the next requires—as much as possible—crossing through a large center square called the skull or skully (hence the name of the game). Boxes "1" and "2" are in opposite corners of the board, as are "3" and "4".

In the center of the skull, a 13th box is drawn at the same size as the other boxes and is labeled "13". The areas around the 13 box are marked with skulls or numbers, and describe a penalty area where players are not meant to shoot their game pieces, called caps.

A short distance from the "1" box is found a start line approximately six inches long.

The dimensions of the skully board can vary depending upon physical restrictions and neighborhood game play practices. Earlier versions of the board had only 9 boxes, and boards used in the similar games like deadbox (played mainly in Philadelphia) have upwards of 15 boxes.

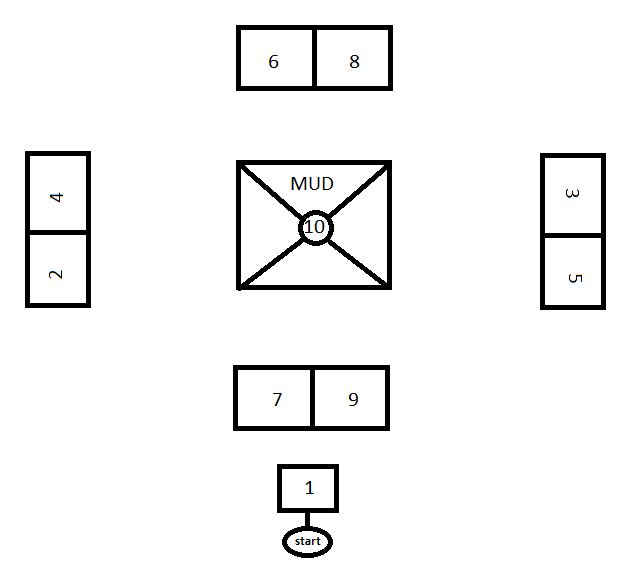
Skully Game Board From New Rochelle, NY circa 1963. If a bottlecap lands in the "mud" area, the player loses 3 turns.

In some layouts, the central area is labeled "MUD" or "BURNS"; if your bottle-cap lands in the MUD you lose 3 turns. The game board goes up to 10 which is in a small circle in the middle of the MUD. Lines connect the corners of the central square with the 10 in a middle circle. There were no numbered squares in the corners of the board and the box labeled "1" is below the main area, with an attached "start" oval.

== Game play ==
Players use caps—usually bottle caps, or similar items like checkers, or chair glides—to play. Many players use clay, wax, and most commonly crayons melted into the bottle cap (these having been referred to as "melties"), even a coin covered with tar or a bottle cap filled with tar that was dug from the streets to weigh down their caps for easier gliding. Caps were typically soft drink bottle caps. Some players took extreme pride in customizing their playing pieces.

On hands and knees, each player begins by placing his cap on the start line and flicks a cap using the middle or index finger launched from behind the thumb. The object is to land it in the box labeled "1". If successful (the cap cannot touch a line), the player continues by flicking for the next number and so on in the sequence: "2", "3", "4" etc., up to "12". If any flick is unsuccessful, the player's turn is forfeited and the next player is up. The cap remains where it lies. When all players have had their turns, the first player resumes by flicking for the square previously missed.

Flicking a piece into a square without touching a line allows the player to immediately take another turn. In addition, if a player strikes another player's cap, he is immediately rewarded with the next box he is going for, allowing him to pick up his cap, walk over to that number, and immediately take an additional turn from there. The player whose cap has been hit must play from where it now lies.

A complication in the game involves the space surrounding the square box "13". If, in flicking for any square (including "13"), a player accidentally lands on the area surrounding "13" (the skull), the player remains stuck there until freed by another player's shot. In one variation such good behavior is motivated by assigning each area a number of bonus squares which advance the player who frees a stuck player. In other variations, the freeing player gets a number of bonus turns equal to the last number in the number the stuck player had reached before getting stuck.

After the player completes the circuit from "1" to "12" and successfully flicks into the square labeled "13", a circuit of the four trapezoids surrounding the "13" square must be made. The circuit of these must be performed in succession in a single turn, with the player saying "I" in the first, "am" in the second, "a" in the third, and finally "killer" in the fourth, or a variation, such as "I'm", "a", "killa". If all trapezoids are not negotiated in succession in a single turn, the turn is forfeited and the process must start again on the player's next turn by first flicking for the "13" square. If the trapezoids are successfully negotiated, the player is deemed to be a 'killer'.

In another variation of the game, players must complete the circuit of numbers from "1" to "13", then backwards back to "1", before making the attempt to become a killer. This version consequently takes more time to play.

The version with MUD in the middle, played in New Rochelle, New York, goes up to 10 and the game board is slightly different. Players must go from the "start" oval to "1" to "10" and then back down to "1", then back to the "start" oval, which is in the center of the lowest part of the game board. This version did not have killers and players did not try to knock other players' bottle caps off the board.

=== End of game sequence ===
Once a player becomes a killer, further flicks of the bottle cap can be used to knock another competitor's bottle cap outside the six-foot square. If successful in this, the player knocked outside the square is "killed" (in other words, removed from the game). In other common variations of the game, the killer needs to strike a non-killer's cap three times in succession in order to "kill" that player, or another killer's cap only once. In some variations, a non-killer can become a killer by striking the killer's cap (hit-a-killer, be-a-killer); additionally, a killer's turn may either end or continue when he "kills" another player, based upon local convention. Also, some variations allow the killer to "walk the lines", the killer will pick up their cap and walk or jump along the lines of the board to get close to another player's cap and shoot from the closest point on the line. Some variations require the new killer to "get out of "town" (the skelly board) to the "killer line" drawn some distance away from the main skelly board. At that point, the killer flicks his top back to the skelly board at which point the killer rules are negotiated by yelling them out, the player saying them first wins: For instance "No hit a killer-be a killer", "three baby taps" or "three blasts", "all boxes are mine", etc. which will govern how powerful the killer will be. Some aggressive players would typically "kill" other player's caps by not just flicking but kicking their own cap into opposing players' caps, called booting, and sending it way out of the board, sometimes damaging or losing the cap, adding further insult to the loss.

The last player on the field wins.

=== History ===
The game was one of the most popular street games in New York City and the surrounding areas from the 1950s through the 1980s, but is less popular today. The remnants of spray-painted skully boards may be found on some streets and school yards. At Bronx House Emanuel Summer Camp, an over-sized skully board was painted on the basketball court and the game was played with shuffleboard equipment.

It is said that the game has existed as long as the crown-rimmed bottle cap, which was invented in 1892. Reference to the game has been made in The New York Times in August 1920, and again in July 1950. In his autobiography, Isaac Asimov recalled playing the game in the 1920s.

== In popular culture ==
- Jean-Michel Basquiat made several paintings in 1980 to 1982 featuring the skully board, remembering playing the game as a child in 1960s Brooklyn.
- A 2010 PBS documentary, New York Street Games, includes skully.
- Skully is played by kids in Jonathan Lethem's novel The Fortress of Solitude (Random House, 2003).
- The Skully Board Killers, a true crime story by Pavle Stanimirovic and Burl Barer, is about the New York City street killers Stanimirovic met throughout his criminal life.
- Skelly is referenced in Tupac Shakur's 1995 track "Old School" from his album Me Against the World.
- The game is referenced in Notorious B.I.G.'s 1994 track "Things Done Changed".
- Skelly is referenced in U-God's verse on Raekwon's song "Knuckleheadz" from the album Only Built 4 Cuban Linx.
- Level 127 of the video game Chips Challenge is titled “Skelzie”, another name for skully, and features a layout loosely based on a skully board.
- Skelly is referenced in Jacqueline Woodson's book Brown Girl Dreaming.
- Skully is referenced in Jacqueline Woodson's picture book The World Belonged to Us.
- The credits on Spike Lee's 1994 semi-biographical feature film Crooklyn, set in the 1970s, show kids playing skully in the street.

== See also ==
- Children's street culture
- Street game
- Crokinole
- Milk caps (game) a disk based game.
- Tiddlywinks another disk based game, involving a pot at the center.
- Carrom
