= Children's street culture =

Outdoor activities and games played by children

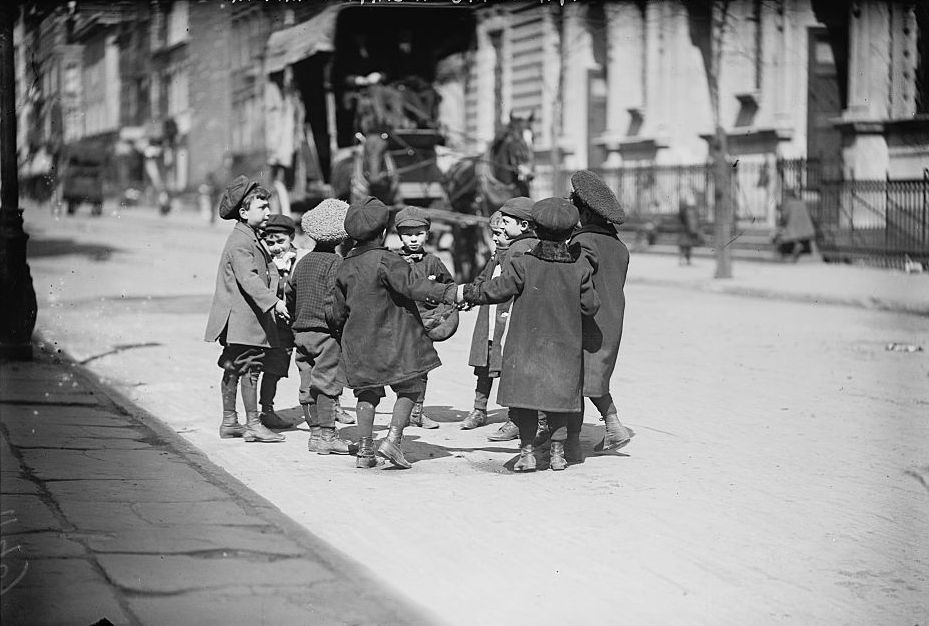
Young boys playing in a New York City street, 1909

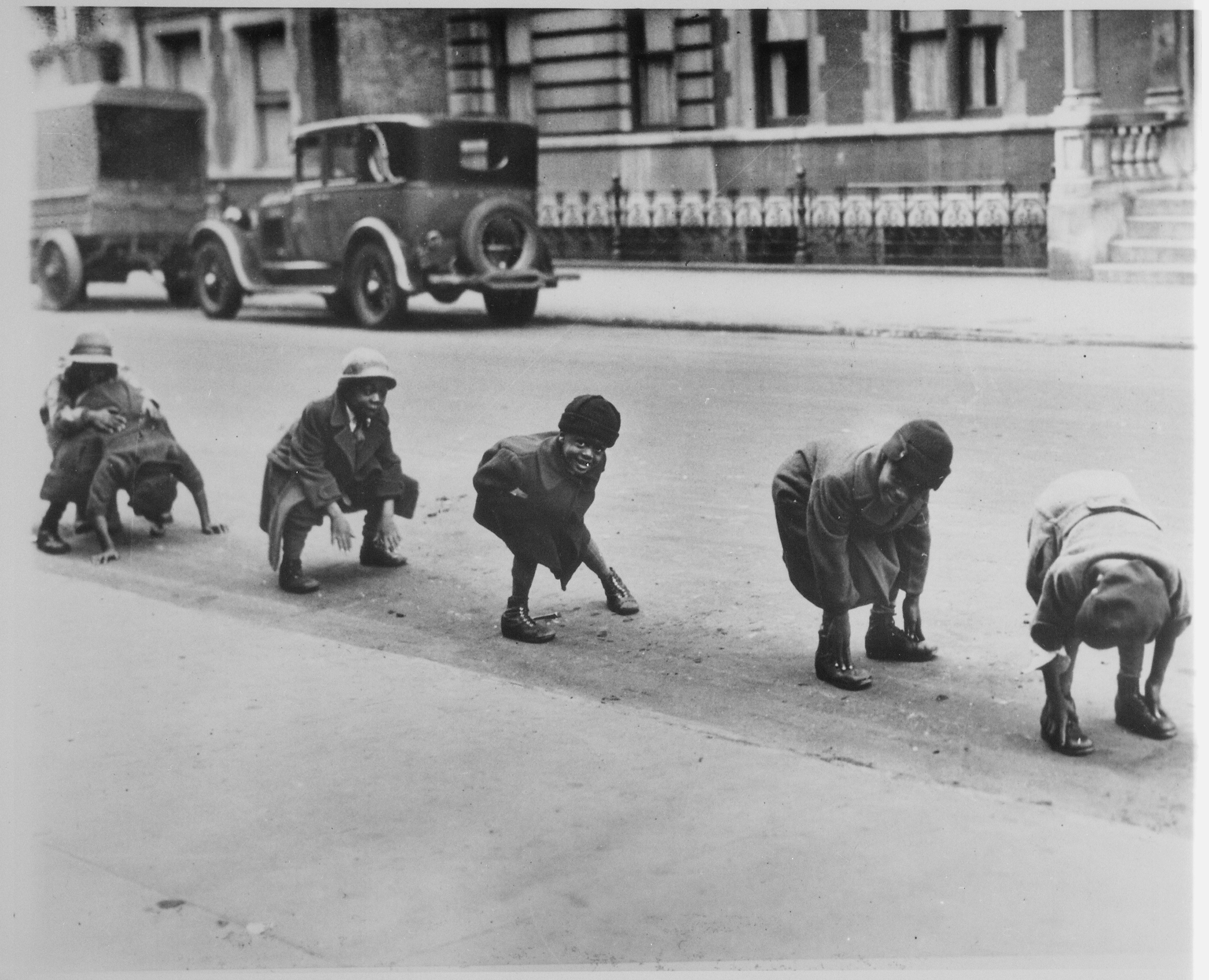
Children playing leap frog in a Harlem street, c. 1930

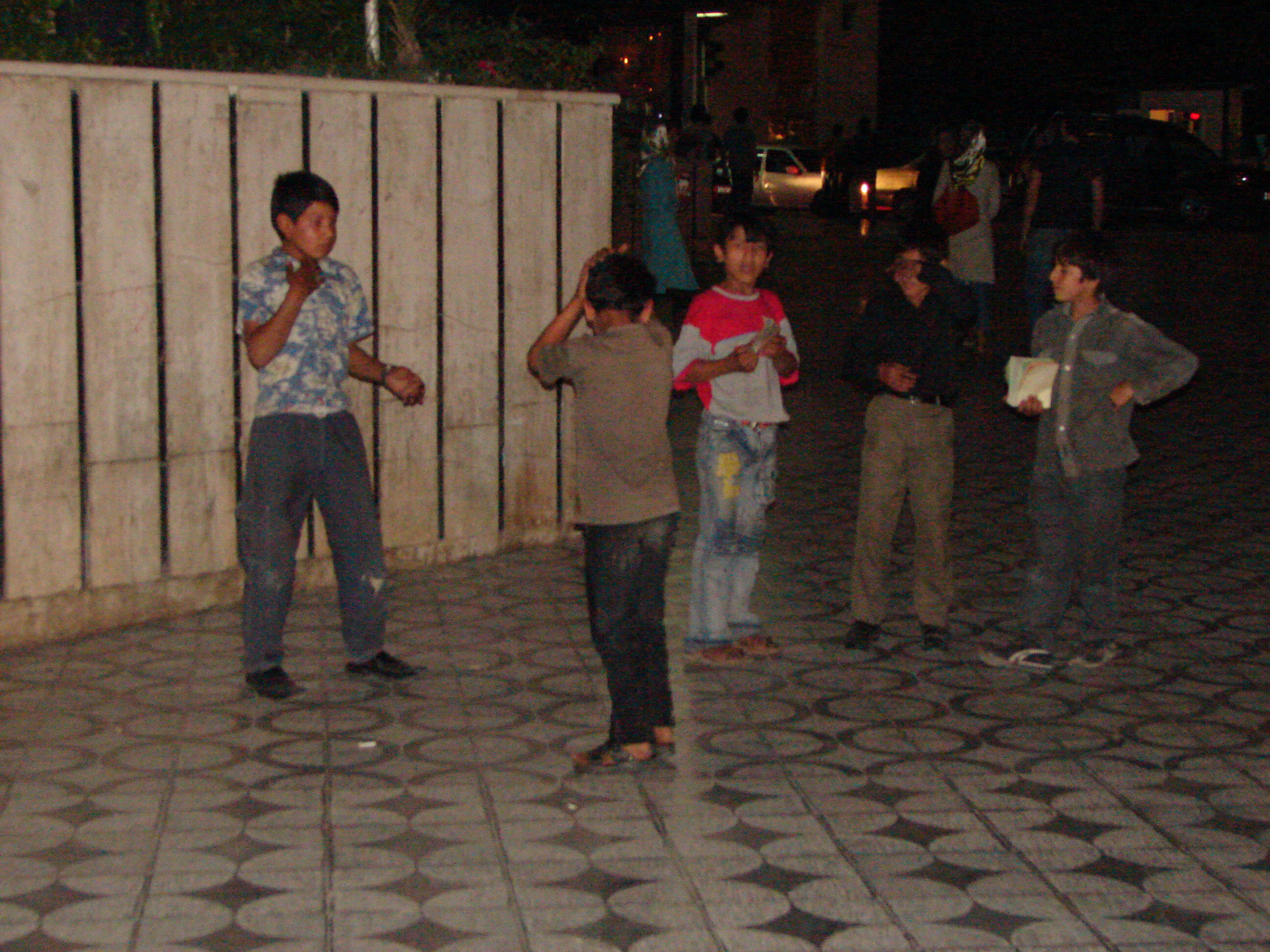
Young boys playing on a sidewalk, 2013, Tehran

Children's street culture is the cumulative body of knowledge created by young children. Collectively, this cultural information is passed down from one generation of urban children to the next, and can also be passed between different groups of children (e.g. in the form of crazes, but also in intergenerational mixing). It is most common in children between the ages of seven and twelve. It is strongest in urban working-class industrial districts where children are traditionally free to play outside in the streets for long periods without supervision.

== Difference from mass media culture ==
Children's street culture is invented and largely sustained by children themselves, although it may come to incorporate fragments of media culture and toys in its activities. It is not to be confused with the commercial media-culture produced for children (e.g., comics, television, mass-produced toys, and clothing), although it may overlap.

== Location and play materials ==
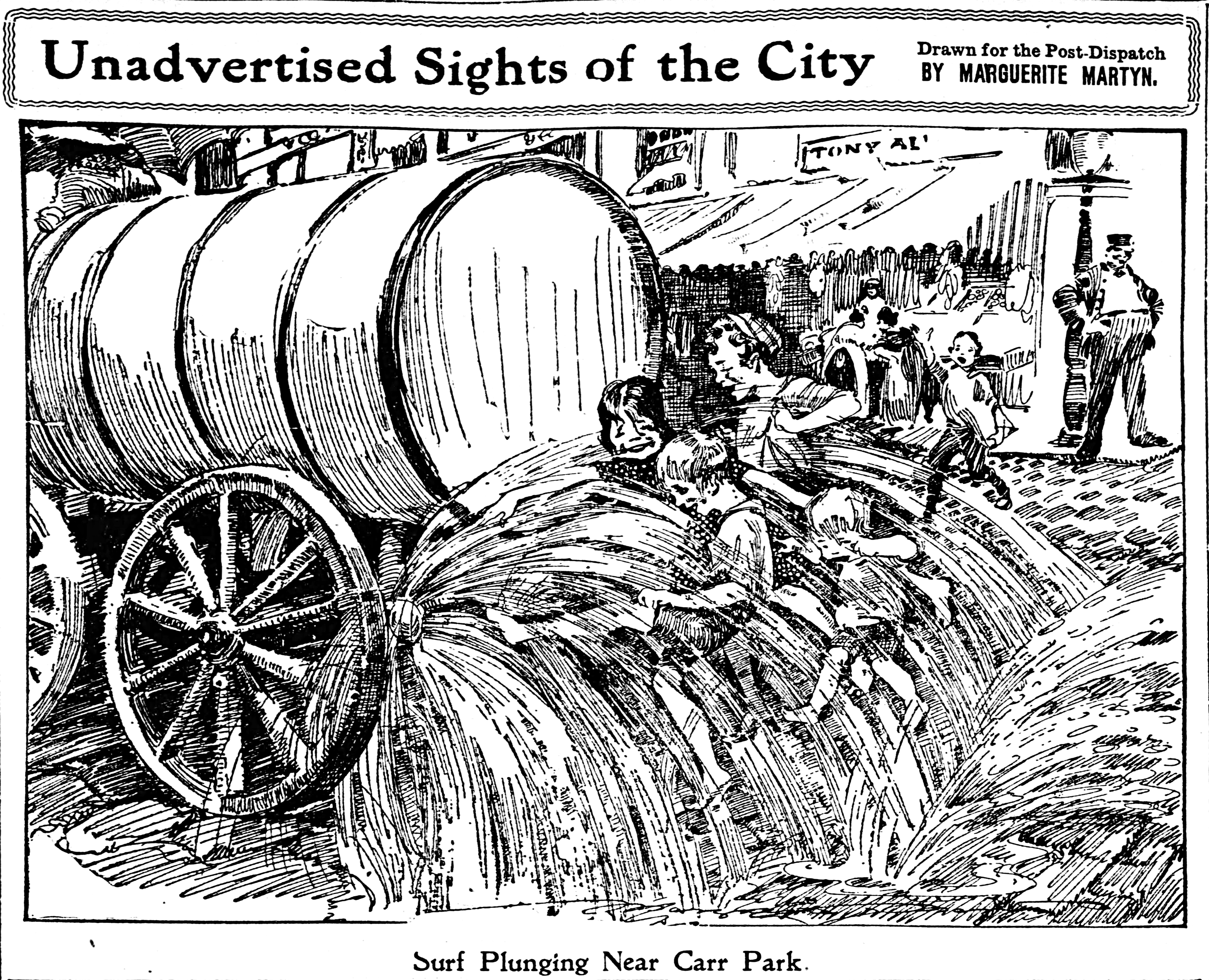
Drawing by Marguerite Martyn of children playing in the rush of water from a street-cleaning wagon, St. Louis, Missouri, 1914

Young children's street culture usually takes place on quiet backstreets and sidewalks, and along routes that venture out into local parks, playgrounds, scrub and wasteland, and to local shops. It can often incorporate many found and scavenged materials such as old car seats, tires, planks, bricks, etc. Sometimes found materials will be combined to create objects (e.g. making guys for Guy Fawkes Night).

Play will often incorporate crazes (sometimes incorporating seasonal elements that are freely collected, such as conkers, snowballs, sycamore seeds). It also imposes imaginative status on certain sections of the urban realm (local buildings, street objects, road layouts, etc.).

In summer, children may use scavenged materials to create a temporary and semi-hidden "den" or "hideout" or "HQ" in a marginal area near their homes, which serves as an informal meeting and relaxation place. An urban area that looks faceless or neglected to an adult may have deep "spirit of place" meanings in children's street culture.

== History and research ==
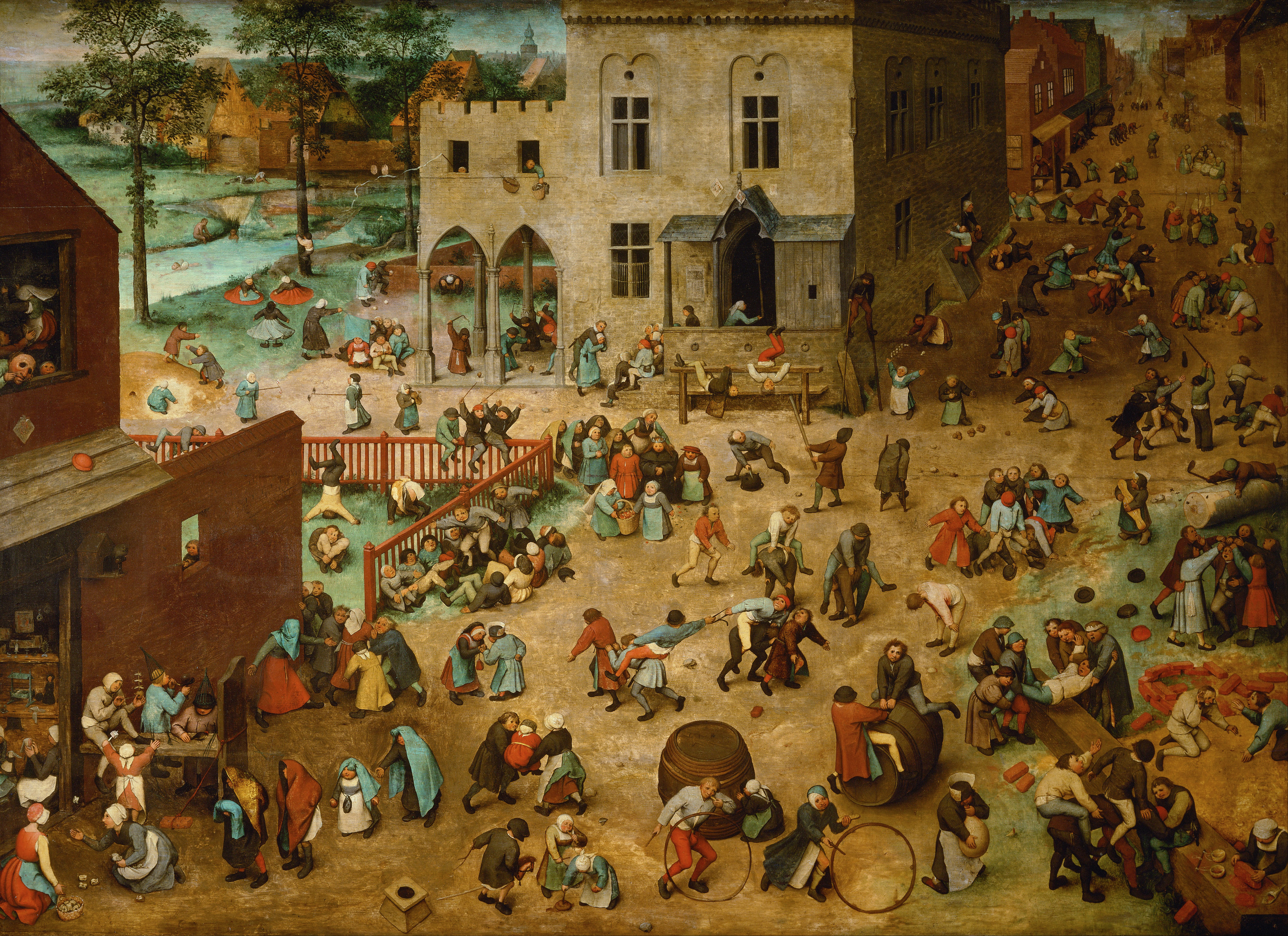
Children's Games (1560)

Although children's street activity varies from place to place, research shows that it appears to share many commonalities across many cultures. As a traditional phenomenon it has been closely investigated and documented in the western world during the 20th century by anthropologists and folklorists such as Iona Opie; street photographers such as Roger Mayne, Helen Levitt, David Trainer, Humphrey Spender Norman Douglas, and Robert Doisneau; urbanists such as Colin Ward and Robin Moore, as well as being described in countless novels of childhood. The research of Robin Moore stresses children's need for "marginal" unsupervised areas "within running distance" of homes (scrubby bushes and hedges, disused buildings). Two academic journals emerged to discuss this area, the Journal of Children's Geographies and Play & Folklore.

Children's street-culture has occasionally been central to feature films, such as the Our Gang ("Little Rascals") series (1922 onwards), Ealing's Hue and Cry (1947) and some Children's Film Foundation productions such as Go Kart, Go! (1963) and The Soap Box Derby (1958).

The spread of distractions such as video games, the Internet, and television has raised concerns about the vitality or survival of children's street culture. The effects of the automobile on society have also been blamed for a decline in children's street-culture, due to safety concerns about children playing outside; between 1922 and 1933, over 12,000 children in England and Wales were killed in accidents involving motor vehicles. The designating of play streets ("home zones") militates against such decline.

== Children's urban legends ==
Many informal groups of small children will develop some level of superstitious beliefs about their local area. For instance, they may believe that there are certain places that are "unlucky" to step on (e.g.: certain large cracks in a sidewalk) or touch (e.g.: gateposts of a certain color) or pass beyond (such as the end of the sidewalk, beyond which is another dimension inhabited by the bogeyman), or that an old woman is a "witch", or that an abandoned house is "haunted". But in some extreme circumstances, a consistent myth may emerge among young children, and across a large area. One example dates from 1997; the Miami New Times published Lynda Edwards' report "Myths Over Miami", which describes a huge consistent mythology spreading among young homeless children in the American South. The story has been picked up and reprinted many times on internet blogs and websites. There is no known verification or confirmation that the mythology she describes actually exists, but these "secret stories" are clearly based on known elements of street culture, such as labeling certain places "haunted" or recycling legends of dangerous spirits such as Bloody Mary. The article was the basis for Mercedes Lackey's novel Mad Maudlin, co-written with Rosemary Edghill, and the reported childlore was also adapted as the basis of one of the myths in Ursula Vernon's Hugo Award-winning webcomic Digger.

== See also ==
- Childlore
- Child art
- Childhood secret club
- Children's geographies
- Effects of the car on societies
- Free-range parenting
- Home zone
- Latchkey kid
- List of traditional children's games
- Peter and Iona Opie
- Playground song
- Street game
- Tree house
- Truce term
- Play street
