= New York Street Games =

- Film poster
- Directed by: Matt Levy
- Written by: Matt Levy; Lars Fuchs
- Produced by: Matt Levy; Craig Lifschutz
- Starring: Keith David; Hector Elizondo; Robert Klein; C. Everett Koop; Arthur Leipzig; Whoopi Goldberg; Bobby Moresco; Joe Pantoliano; Regis Philbin; Robert Costanzo; David Proval; Ray Romano; Curtis Sliwa; Annie Lanzillotto; Mike Starr; Vinny Vella
- Narrated by: Hector Elizondo
- Cinematography: Michael Vitti
- Edited by: Lars Fuchs; Paul Petschek
- Music by: Butch Barbella
- Release date: 2010
- Running time: 76 minutes
- Country: United States
- Language: English

New York Street Games is a 2010 documentary film directed by Matt Levy about children's games played by kids in New York City for centuries. The games are fondly remembered by people who grew up in the city. Current and historical documentary footage shows children playing these games, interspersed with scenes of celebrities discussing their own childhood experiences playing these games on the streets of New York. The story is brought to the present with discussions of the current role of street games and opinions as to what kids lose by not having the freedom to play without adult supervision, most importantly the social skills developed when kids could play in the streets.

== Synopsis ==
New York Street Games recalls a central feature of the lives of hundreds of thousands of children who grew up in New York City in the twentieth century: games played in the streets of the city. Many of the ball games featured are played with a pink rubber ball called a Spaldeen. In the documentary, Whoopi Goldberg is seen discussing her childhood and handling a Spaldeen. At some point, she puts the ball to her nose and smells it; by the look on her face she is transported by her memories of playing games with a Spaldeen as a child.

== The games ==
- Stickball
- Ringolevio
- Stoopball
- Kick the can
- Punchball
- Hopscotch
- Slapball
- Hit the Stick
- Skully
- Double Dutch
- Johnny on a Pony
- Boxball
- Steal the bacon
- Ace-King-Queen
- Red Rover
- Off the Wall
- Box Baseball
- Red Light, Green Light – 1, 2, 3
- Wooden Tops

== See also ==
- Traditional games of New York City
