= Ringolevio =

Children's game

Ringolevio (also spelled ringalevio or ring-a-levio) is a children's game that originated in the streets of New York City, where it is known to have been played at least as far back as the late 19th century. (Note: Before the first World War, one of the greatest games kids played was Ringolevio. In front of the Grace Church on East 92nd Street and Church Lane, each weeknight we formed a circle of 10 or 12 of us in two teams. The ones who went to hide would then try to sneak back without being caught by one of the guardians of the circle. If a boy managed to get in without being caught, he would yell, "Ringolevio!" and free everyone that had previously been caught. This went on until about 9 p.m. when we had to go home. Denton, John (2006-11-23). "Playing Ringolevio In Front Of Grace Church". Canarsie Courier. Brooklyn, New York. Archived from the original on 2015-09-23.) It is one of the many variations of tag. In Canada, the game is known as Relievio, a name that was also used in Boston and Ireland in the 1950s. It is also, in some places, known as coco-levio.

American activist and author Emmett Grogan wrote a fictionalized autobiography called Ringolevio, which was published in 1972. Grogan wrote: "It's a game. A game played on the streets of New York, for as long as anyone can remember. It is called Ringolevio, and the rules are simple. There are two sides, each with the same number of players. There are no time limits, no intermissions, no substitutes, and no weapons allowed. There are two jails. There is one objective."

According to Stewart Culin, relievo became ring relievo and then ringoleavio. A similar game, called Prisoner's Base, was played by members of Lewis and Clark's Corps of Discovery against a group of Nez Perce.

== Rules ==
The game typically splits players into two teams, one of "hunters" and one of "prey". A confined area called "jail" is marked. Games often have set boundaries of how far from the jail pursued players can go.

The goal of the hunting team is to catch the "prey" by grabbing hold of them and performing a chant. This chant varies between regions, with different versions of the game using chants such as "chain chain double chain, no break away" and "Ringolevio, 1-2-3, 1-2-3, 1-2-3". If the pursued person breaks free at any point during this brief recitation, the person is not caught and can still play. If the chant is finished, the hunter takes the prey to jail (also called the "base" in some variations) and the captive is considered "out".

The prey can free captured team members by entering the jail without being caught, tagging the captives and shouting, "All in! All in! Free-all!" (other phrases used include "All in, all in, all in, free allo" and "Olly olly oxen free").

== In popular culture ==
In addition to Emmet Grogan's book, the game is mentioned in:

=== Films ===
- In Roger Corman's The Young Racers (1963), Robert Machin (Robert Campbell) mentions "Ring-a-Leerio" in conversation with his brother, Joe (his real-life brother William Campbell).
- The PBS documentary, New York Street Games (2010), as one of the games popular in New York City.
- In the 1998 film Fallen John Goodman shouts "Olly Olly Oxen Free O" upon encountering Denzel Washington.

=== Literature ===
- The title of Part I of Colson Whitehead's novel "Crook Manifesto" is "Ringolevio."
- In Stephen King's Hearts in Atlantis, The Waste Lands, and It.
- As ring-a-levio and ring-a-leary-o, in George Carlin's autobiography Last Words.
- As one game played by several kids (including the author himself) in Bob Keeshan's autobiography, Good Morning, Captain.
- As one game mentioned in Huey P. Newton's autobiography, Revolutionary Suicide. (Part One, Chapter 3)
- As ringolevio in Pat Conroy's Prince of Tides. (Note: I do not know, however, when my mother and father began their long, dispiriting war against each other. Most of their skirmishes were like games of ringolevio, with the souls of their children serving as the ruined captured flags in their campaigns of attrition.)
- In the Little Italy section of Don DeLillo's novel Underworld.
- In Daniel Keyes's novel Flowers for Algernon when Charlie remembers a playground scene.
- As coco-levio in the book Brown Girl Dreaming by Jacqueline Woodson in the poem called "Game Over".
- In the novel Manhattan Beach by Jennifer Egan.
- In the New Yorker essay Not Becoming My Father by Michael Chabon.
- In Roddy Doyle's Booker Prize-winning novel Paddy Clarke Ha Ha Ha.
- In Bill O'Reilly's book A Bold Fresh Piece of Humanity.
- As ringalevio in Jacquelin Woodson's picture book The World Belonged to Us
- As ring-a-levio in Mel Brooks' book All About Me!.
- As ring-a-lievio in Steven Millhauser's book Edwin Mullhouse: The Life and Death of an American Writer 1943-1954 by Jeffrey Cartwright.
- As ringolevio in William Manchester's history The Glory and the Dream.
- As Ring-A-Legio in Jim Shepherd's novel Phase Six, a Ch. II subheading.

=== Music ===
- French singer Little Bob called his 1987 album and the title track "Ringolevio".
- The rapper Notorious B.I.G. mentions the game, calling it "coco-levo", in the song "Things Done Changed" on his album Ready to Die (1994). He notes that the game is no longer played and this is a symptom of social decline in inner city ghettos.
- Ring-a-levio is mentioned in rapper 2pac's song "Old School".
- Lyricist Robert Hunter mentions "On the bank where children play 'ring a levio'" in his 1975 song "Tiger Rose".
- Relievio is mentioned in Boston-based band Damone's song "On My Mind".
- The song "Ringolevio" on the album Snowmads (2019) by hip hop group Onyx.

=== Television ===
- A game of ringolevio figures prominently in The Twilight Zone episode "The Incredible World of Horace Ford."
- In The Simpsons episode "The D'oh-cial Network," Lisa asks Sherri and Terri to play ringolevio (as "ringolivio") among other games but is ignored. Later, they play Marco Polo instead.
- In an episode of Brooklyn Bridge, the kids and adults play Ringolevio as part of their indoor rainy day olympics.

== Notes and references ==
Notes

Citations
