= Crossed fingers =

Hand gesture

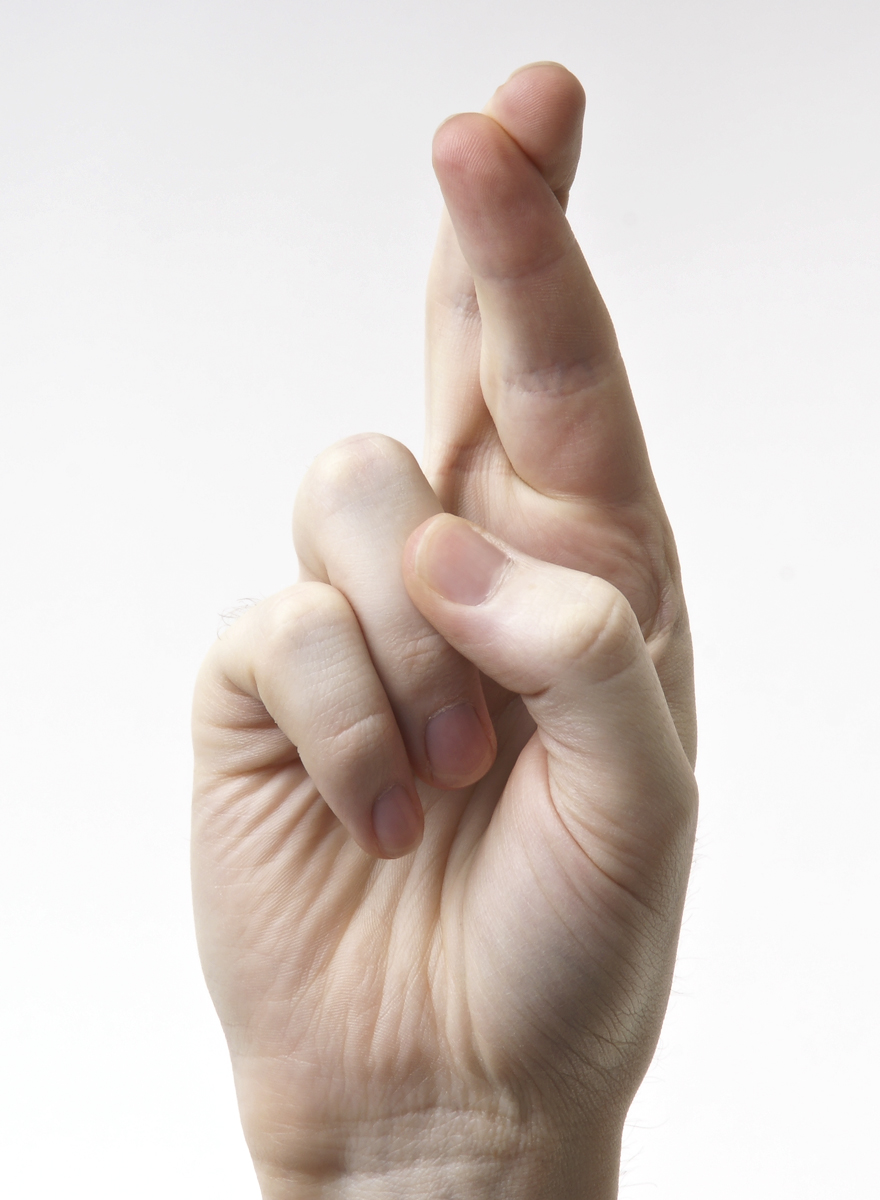
Crossed fingers

To cross one's fingers is a hand gesture commonly used to wish for luck or to bid one Godspeed. Early Christians used the gesture to implore the protection of the Holy Cross. The gesture is referred to by the common expressions "cross your fingers", "keep your fingers crossed", or just "fingers crossed". Historically, the gesture was accompanied by the words "God spede you" or "God be with you."

The gesture was appropriated by children when telling a white lie. By extension, a similar belief is that crossing one's fingers invalidates a promise being made.

== Origin ==
The crossed fingers gesture is believed to have originated with its resemblance to the Cross of Christ. Christians believe that "they could protect themselves from evil by making a cross with their fingers" (cf. sacramental). It gained traction, especially in 16th-century England, where people crossed their fingers to ward off evils and ill health.

== Related gestures ==
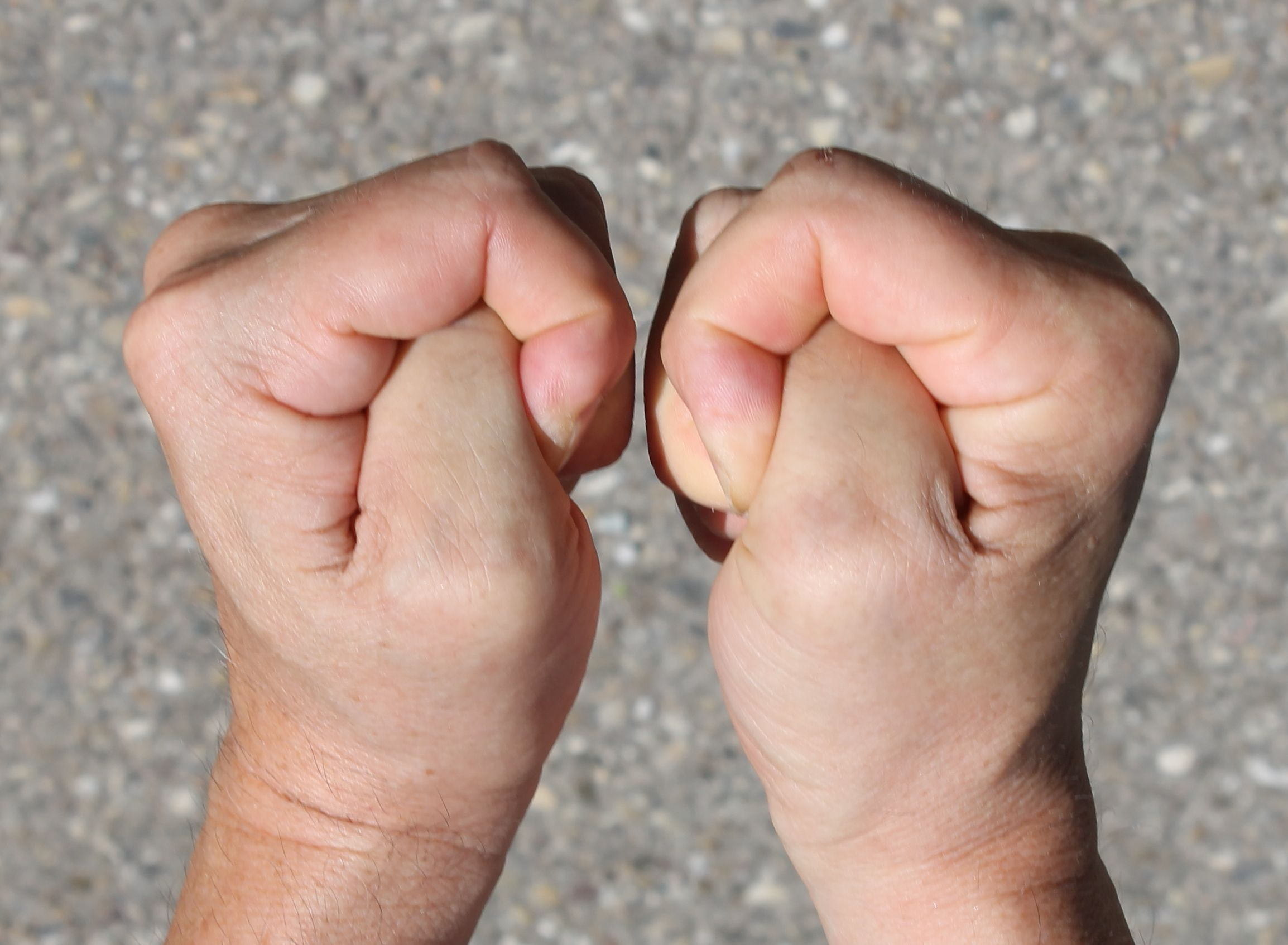
Pressing thumbs as gesture to wish for luck in German-speaking and many Slavic countries

In Vietnam the gesture is considered rude, especially to another person.

In German-speaking countries (de:Gekreuzte Finger), as well as Sweden (wikt:sv:hålla tummarna) and Latvia, the gesture is a sign of lying. Instead, wishing for luck is gestured by holding or pressing one’s thumbs. The same gesture is used in many Slavic countries such as Poland (pl:Trzymanie kciuków), the Czech Republic, Slovakia, Bulgaria and ex-Yugoslav republics. In South Africa, Afrikaans speakers also have the related phrase "duim vashou" meaning "holding thumbs tightly".

== See also ==
- Benediction
- God bless you
- Orans
- Sacramentals
- Sfiga
- Holding thumbs
