= Kick the can =

Children's game

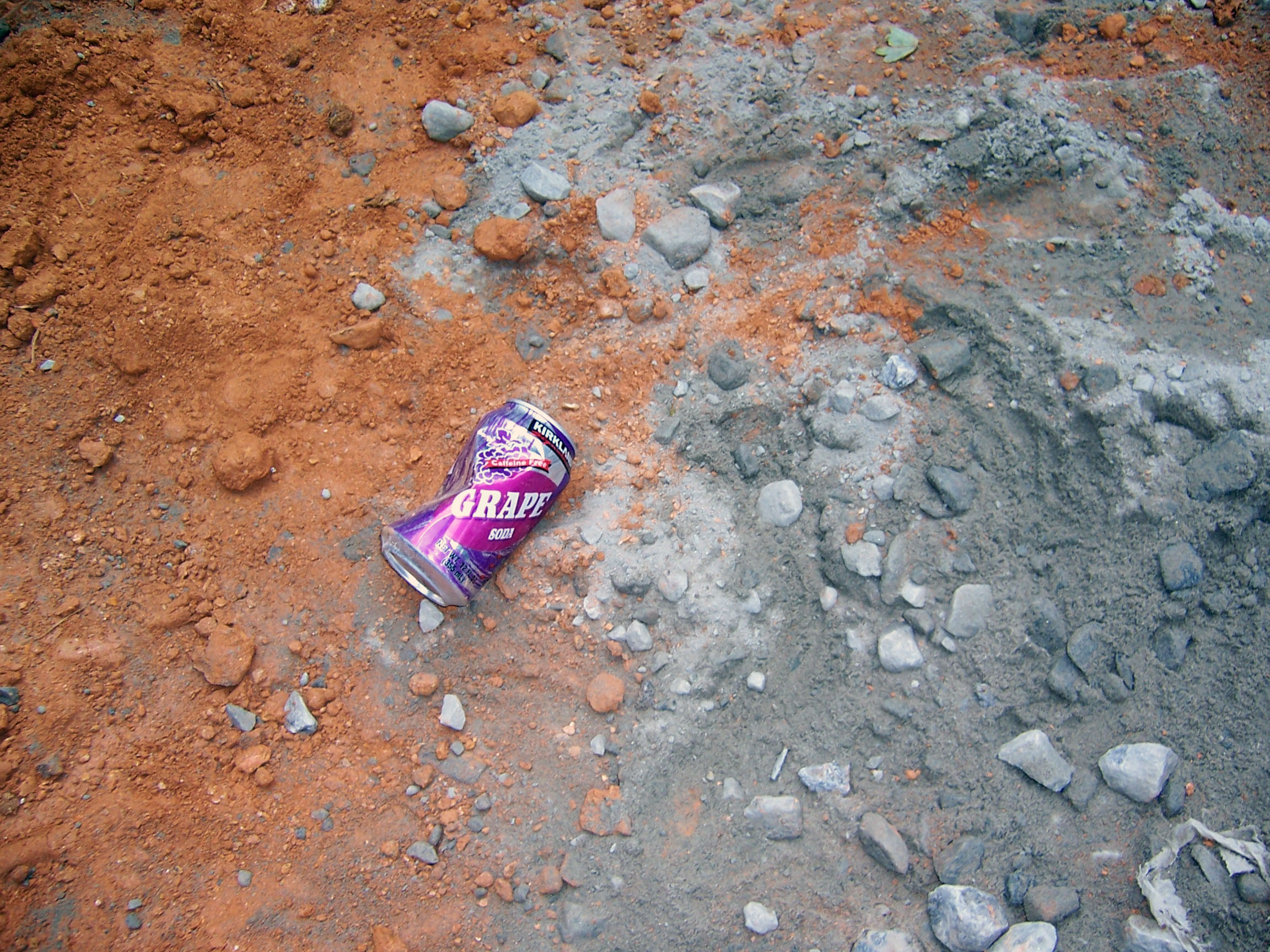
A discarded beverage can.

Kick the can (also known as kick the block, guard the block, can can, 40 40, pom pom, tip the can, tin can copper, and can up can down), is an outdoor children's game related to tag, hide and seek, and capture the flag, played with as few as three to as many as several dozen players. The game is one of skill, strategy, stealth, and stamina.

The game is played with a kickable object, usually a discarded empty can, sometimes with rocks inserted for noise. The game was a popular pick-up game during difficult economic times. The origin is unknown, but during the Great Depression in the 1930s the game was a popular pastime because it did not require a playing field, nor any designated equipment other than a discarded can or other kickable object.

== Basic play ==
One person or a team of people is designated as “it” and a can or similar object—paint can or metal pail or bucket—is placed in an open space: the middle of a backyard, a green, a cove or cul-de-sac, parking lot or street. The other players run off and hide while “it” covers their eyes and counts to a previously decided number. Alternatively, the start of the game begins when a designated kicker literally “kicks the can” as far as possible. The person who is “it” must return the can to its starting place before “it” can continue play, thus giving the other players time to escape. “It” then tries to find and tag each of the players. Any player who is tagged (caught and touched) is sent to the holding pen (jail) which is simply a designated area for all the captured players to congregate, generally in plain sight of the can. Any player who has not been caught can “kick the can” or “tip the can.” If they can do this without being caught, then all the captured players are set free. Alternatively, one of the captured players is set free each time the can is tipped—the first person caught is the first to be set free, the second person caught is the second to be set free, etc. until the person tipping the can is tagged or all the captured players are freed. If “it” catches all the players, they win that round, and generally a new “it” is designated for the next round. The new “it” is usually the person who has been held the longest by the time round ends.

== Variations ==
In some variations "it" also means the tagger in the game of Tag merely has to call out a player's name and hiding place rather than tagging them by touch. In some variations, "it" must jump over the can after calling the player's name and location.

In another variation, when "it" sees or finds a person hiding, "it" must run back to the can and place one foot on it while saying the found person is in the can (e.g. "Tim is in the can") before the found person is able to reach the can and tip it. Thus, once a person is found or seen by "it", the game becomes a race to the can between the found person and "it". In order for someone to be caught and put in "jail", "it" must have beat the found person to the can and pronounced that person "in the can". "It" also could say "1–2–3 on.." whoever they found, while touching the can. [This variant is also called "Pan Hoop" in Trinidad & Tobago]

As another variation, more than one can is used. The cans or cartons are scattered at the beginning of the game when everyone runs to hide. "It" must gather them and stack them so they don't fall over. Then, when "it" spots someone hiding, "it" must run back and touch the tower of cartons without knocking them down. If they fall, the "caught" hider can run away and hide again. If they remain standing, the hider goes to jail. While "it" is searching for others, someone not yet caught can sneak in and tip over the cartons, freeing those in jail.

In some cases, if the can is being tipped by one of the players that was hiding, instead of tagging the tipper to prevent the tipper from freeing any more captured players, the "it" must get in a tip at the can to prevent the other tipper from freeing any more captured players.

Another variation was to have two teams at either end of the road with an upright can in a chalk circle in the middle. In turn each team would roll a soft rubber or tennis ball and attempt to knock over the can. If your team (Team A) managed to knock over the can they would then run off and to win the game they had to return to the can and stand it up using only their feet. The opposing team (Team B) would try to stop them from standing the can up by throwing the ball at the Team A members. The ball holder from Team B had to stand in the same position and either pass to another team member or throw at an opponent . If they managed to hit a person from Team A they had to freeze. They could only be released if one of their own team went under their legs or when the can was eventually stood up. During the active game Team A could not touch the ball.

Another variation (called kick the tin) or (can can) played in Northern Ireland & England, esp. Birmingham Shard End area. The aim was to start the game by one of the hiders being selected to kick the tin, the further the tin was kicked gave more time for players to hide. A favoured strategy was to kick it over a garden hedge making it harder to retrieve. The seeker had to retrieve the tin and count loudly so that the hiders knew they were ready to start searching. When the seeker saw a hider they would race each other back to the tin and the seeker had to knock the tin three times before the hider could kick it away and releasing themselves and others. Hiders would try to sneak closer to the tin so that when the seeker was far from it they would try to kick the tin to release hiders previously caught. If a seeker was unlucky they could be seeking all afternoon. This game was very popular in the 1970s and was played by kids from 5 to 18 years olds.

== Cultural significance ==
Kick the can was very popular among kids during the Great Depression. The game is mentioned in Francisco Jiménez's book The Circuit: Stories from the Life of a Migrant Child. Play scholar Rodney Carlisle notes that: "As outdoor and unstructured play of children continues to dwindle, the game of Kick the Can is becoming less and less known to each generation... At one point in time, teenagers played Kick the Can with younger children, and the game and its variations were passed on from child to child. Past generations remember this game fondly, and it was enough of a cultural phenomenon that it was a central element in a 1962 episode of The Twilight Zone and was incorporated later in the 1983 film of the same name." It is included in the 2010 PBS documentary New York Street Games. It is also depicted in the 1997 indie film Nowhere.
