= Steal the bacon =

Children's game

Steal the bacon (also steal the flingsock, steal the handkerchief, Dog and the Bone, or in India Rumal Jhapatta) is a tag-based traditional children's game, in which teams try to steal a flag or other item (the "bacon") from the field without being tagged. The game is played with players divided into teams and assigned a call-signs, and a referee to call out the call signs. There are variations on gameplay, including rules that increase educational value or physicality.

== Rules ==
The players are divided into teams, typically two. Players are assigned a call-sign, often a number, which is shared by a member of the opposing team. The teams line up on opposite edges of the playing area, at a distance enough to run across from each other, which has the "bacon" (a small object which can be grabbed and carried) in the center. A referee calls out the call-sign, and the team members who have that call-sign must run to the center, grab the bacon, and return to their teammates without being tagged by the other player(s) with that call-sign. The one that manages to return with the object to his/her team gets a point. If tagged, the other team gets the point. Tagging of a player may not occur before that player has touched the "bacon". The referee may call out more than one call-sign resulting in many pairs of players, each player attempting to steal the "bacon." The referee may also call "steal the bacon" in which all players on both sides may attempt to steal the "bacon."

=== Variants ===
The game works well when directed by a teacher or another adult who gives the same chances to both teams and all players. There are also educational variants of this game, in which the players' call sign is not directly called, but is the answer to a history, mathematics, or other educational question. The game thus rewards players ability to solve the question and deduce which answer corresponds to their call-sign.

A full contact version of steal the bacon is played at many summer camps, in which the player carrying the bacon is not simply tagged by the opponent, but must be physically kept from crossing back over his team's line. Other full-contact variants for teenagers and adults include versions where items such as tires, fish or greased watermelons are substituted for the "bacon."

== Popular culture ==
- The 2003 video game Crash Nitro Kart features Steal the bacon as a Battle mode. It later reappeared in the 2019 video game Crash Team Racing Nitro-Fueled.
- A 2010 PBS documentary, New York Street Games, mentions steal the bacon.

== See also ==
- Capture the flag
- Duck, duck, goose
