= Punchball =

Baseball variant

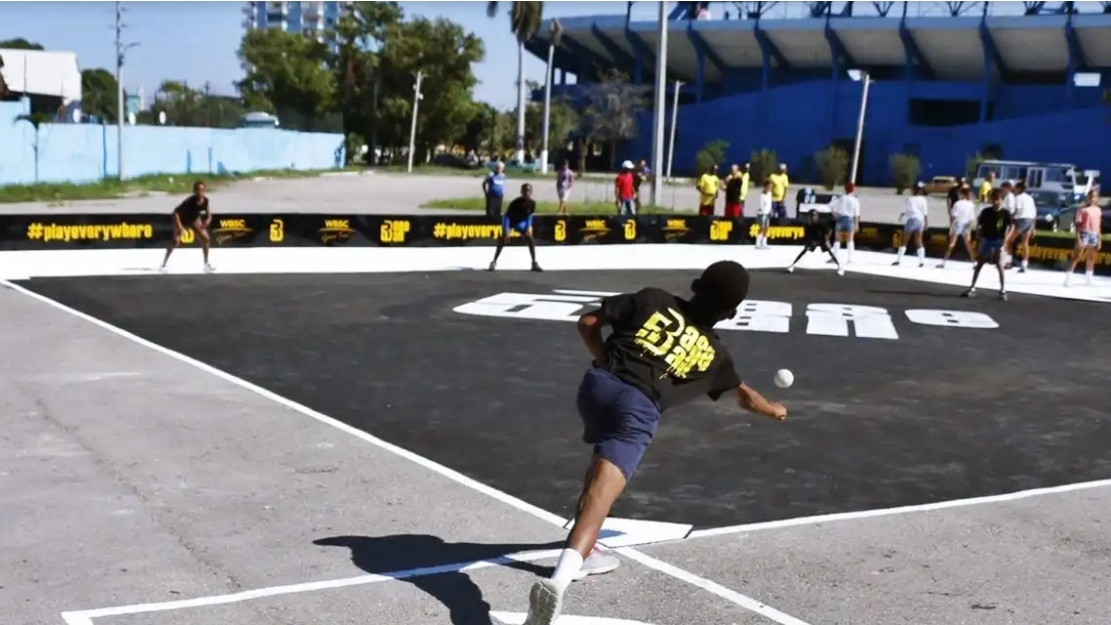
A Baseball5 batter hitting the ball punchball-style

Punchball is a sport spawned by and similar to baseball, but without a pitcher, catcher, or bat.

The "batter" essentially plays "fungo" without a bat, bouncing or tossing up the ball and then using a volleyball type approach to put the ball in play, punching the ball with his fist. The ball was usually a rubber spaldeen or pensie pinkie, but even a tennis ball or wad of taped-up paper can be used. (Note: In some variations of punchball, known as sockball, the ball was either a rolled up sock or a volleyball.) Base stealing, foul balls, and bunting are not allowed.

== History ==
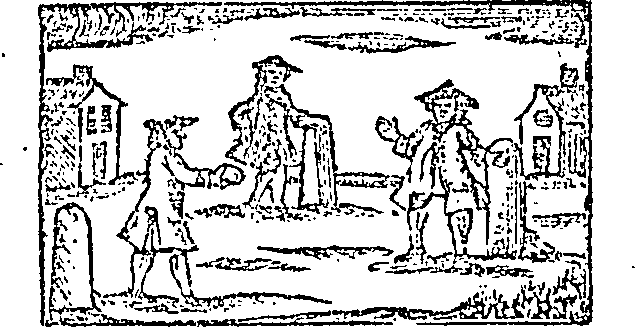
The alleged first depiction of a punchball-like game, with the players standing at posts instead of bases

The origins of punchball may date to the 18th century and earlier, as John Thorn, official historian for Major League Baseball, has suggested that the depiction of baseball in A Little Pretty Pocket-Book, which was the first appearance in print of the sport, involved batters hitting with a hand.

Popular in New York in the early 20th century, especially among poor working-class children who could not afford bats or baseballs, historian and baseball enthusiast Stephen Jay Gould referred to it as "the canonical recess game", and in The Boys of Summer baseball writer Roger Kahn described how when he grew up it was a boys' game, as the girls played "slapball". Punchball's popularity derived partially from the fact that it carried less risk of losing the ball or breaking windows than a standard game of baseball, and that it could be played with fewer people.

== Variations ==
In one version of punchball, a line was drawn between first base and third base, and the batter would be out if the ball was hit into the ground before passing the line. In another variation, the batter had to hit only into the infield.

In slapball, as Roger Kahn and Robert Mayer describe it, the game was played in a triangular field with only three bases. For this reason, the game could also be called triangle. Slapball can be played with up to ten players on each team (with the tenth player acting as a fourth outfielder), with a pitcher throwing the ball underhand on one bounce to the batter.

Punchball could be played with as few as two players on each team, and was typically played with five to six players on each team. There were a number of ways to make the game work with only two players on each team; fewer infielders were required when "pegging" (throwing at a runner instead of tagging them to get them out) and "homing" (throwing the ball toward home plate to get a runner out) were allowed, and in Mayer's version, punchball could be played with only three bases, along with something akin to basketball hoops being installed at center field; a home run was declared if the ball was hit into the hoops, but an out declared if the ball was hit just above them. Sliding into bases was also not allowed.

== Popular culture ==
A 2010 PBS documentary, New York Street Games, includes punchball.

In season 10, episode 7 of Curb Your Enthusiasm, Larry David states that he played punchball after grieving the death of his pet turtle.

=== Reception ===
Baseball Hall of Famers Sandy Koufax and Yogi Berra played it growing up, as did sports team owner Jerry Reinsdorf, Senator Bernie Sanders, and former US Secretary of State and general Colin Powell. Major league outfielder Rocky Colavito recalled playing punchball, also saying that they used to play this game for money. It was also a pastime of football announcer Al Michaels, who often played with former Chicago Bears quarterback Sid Luckman.

== See also ==
- Safe haven games
- Variations of baseball
  - Baseball5, a similar game played at an international level
  - Kickball, a variation of baseball where a large hollow ball is kicked by the batter
    - Matball – kickball with gym mats for bases
- Leg cricket – variation of cricket when foot is used to propel the ball rather than a bat
- American handball, also involves hitting the ball with the hands
  - Hand pelota
