= Hide-and-seek =

Children's game

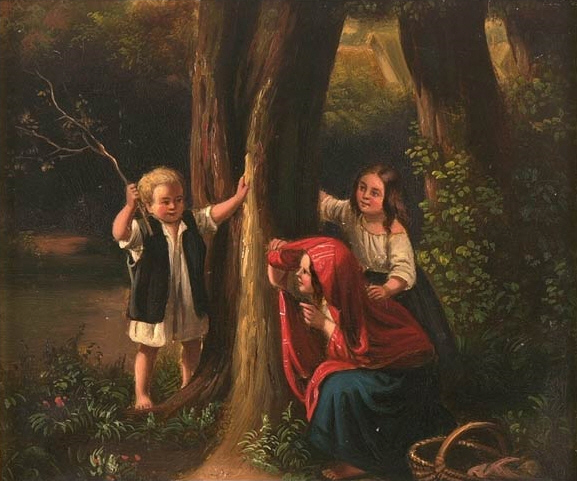
- A 19th-century painting of three children playing hide-and-seek in a forest (Friedrich Eduard Meyerheim)
- Players: 2+
- Playing time: No limit
- Chance: Very low
- Skills: Running, tracking, hiding, observation

Hide-and-seek or hide-and-go-seek is a children's game played by least two players, in which hiders conceal themselves within the surrounding environment while seekers attempt to locate them. The game is initiated after the seeker counts to a predetermined number with their eyes closed while the other players find hiding spots. After counting, the seeker calls out to the hiders and must locate them.

The game can end in one of several ways. The most common way of ending is when the seeker locates all players; the player found first is the loser and may be chosen to be the seeker in the next game, while the player found last is the winner.

== Variants ==
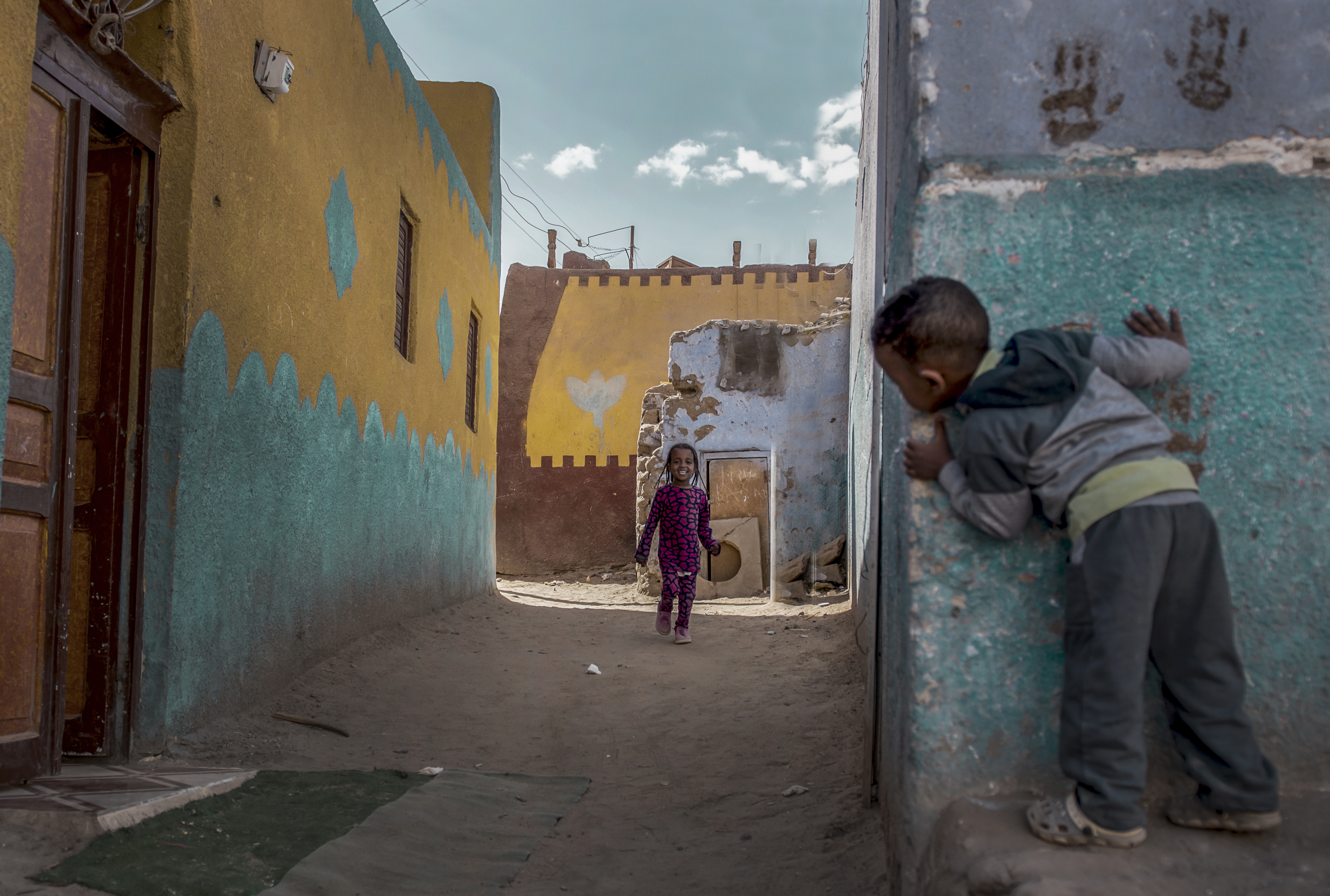
Children playing hide-and-seek

Different versions of the game are played around the world, under a variety of names.

One variant is called "sardines", in which only one person hides and the others must find them, hiding with them when they do so. The hiding places become progressively more cramped, like sardines in a tin. The last person to find the hiding group is the loser, and becomes the hider for the next round. A. M. Burrage calls this version of the game "Smee" in his 1931 ghost story of the same name.

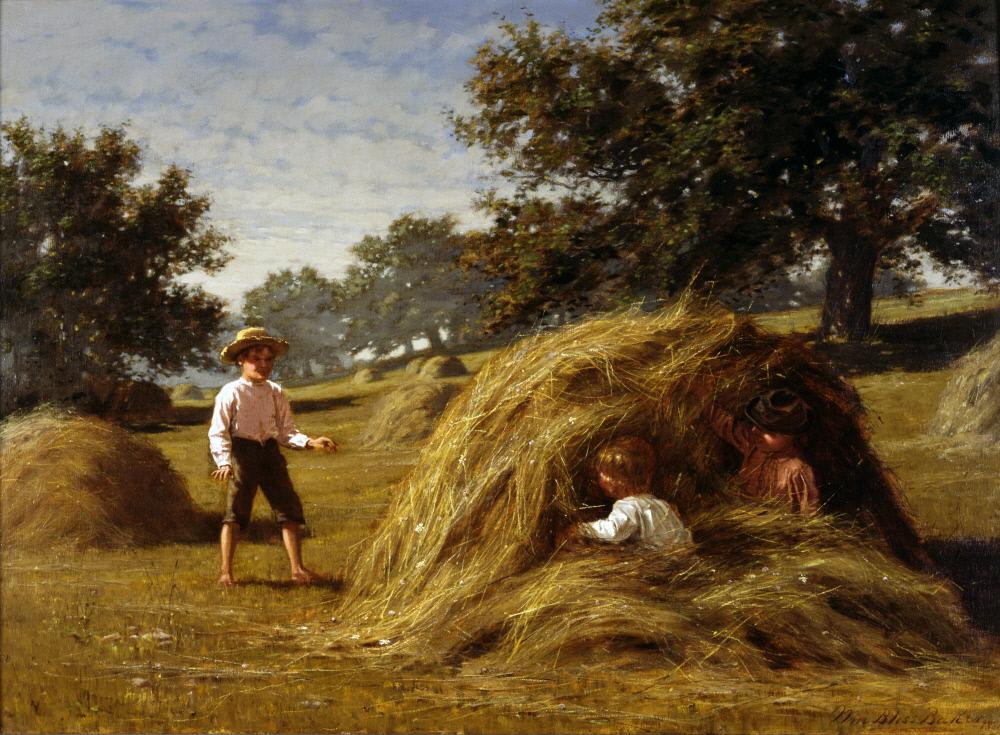
Hide and Seek (painting 1881)

In the Peanuts comic strip by Charles Schulz, a variation of Sardines called "Ha Ha Herman" is played, in which the seekers call out "ha ha', and the person hiding has to respond by saying "Herman". In some versions of the game, after the first hider is caught or if no other players can be found over a period of time, the seeker calls out a previously-agreed phrase (such as "Olly olly oxen free", "Come out, come out wherever you are" or "All in, All in, Everybody out there all in free") to signal the other hiders to return to base for the next round. The seeker must return to "home base" after finding the hiders, before the hiders get back. Conversely, the hiders must get back to "home base" before the seeker sees them and returns. The hiders hide until they are spotted by the seeker, who chants, "Forty, forty, I see you" (sometimes shortened to "Forty, forty, see you").

Once spotted, the hider must run to "home base" (where the seeker was counting while the other players hid) and touch it before they are "tipped" (tagged, or touched) by the seeker. If tagged, that hider becomes the new seeker. Forty forty has many regional names including 'block one two three' in North East England and Scotland, 'relievo one two three' in Wilmslow, 'forty forty' in South East England, 'mob' in Bristol and South Wales, 'pom pom' in Norwich, 'I-erkey' in Leicester, 'hicky one two three' in Chester, 'rally one two three' in Coventry, ' Ackey 123' in Birmingham and '44 Homes' in Australia.

== History ==
Whilst hide-and-seek is evidently likely a very ancient and instinctual childhood game from time immemorial, an early attested version of the game was called apodidraskinda (ἀποδιδρασκίνδα) in Ancient Greek. This game is also referred to by variations of the name, such as phyginda (φυγίνδα) or pheyginda (φευγίνδα). A second century Greek writer named Julius Pollux mentioned the game for the first time. Then as now, it was played the same with one player closing their eyes and counting while the other players hide. This game was also found in an early painting discovered at Herculaneum, dating back to about the second century AD.

== Psychology ==
Hide-and-seek requires children to use both theory of mind and executive function mechanisms to successfully play the game, such as inhibiting the desire to cheat by peeking while playing the role of the seeker. As a result, it may be used as a relatively naturalistic setting for researchers to study children's abilities with these cognitive mechanisms. Hide-and-seek games can also be used by adults to instill social values and useful skills in children, as in the example of the father-son gukwelonone hide-and-seek game among the Onge hunter-gatherers of Little Andaman Island.

== International competition ==
The Hide-and-Seek World Championship was an international hide-and-seek competition held from 2010 through 2017. The game is a derivative of the Italian version of hide-and-seek, "nascondino".

The championship was first held in 2010 in Bergamo, Italy, as an initiative of CTRL Magazine. Though it started out as a joke, the event grew year after year. The 2016 and 2017 competitions took place in Consonno, a ghost town or "The Italian Las Vegas", located in the district of Lecco, Lombardy.

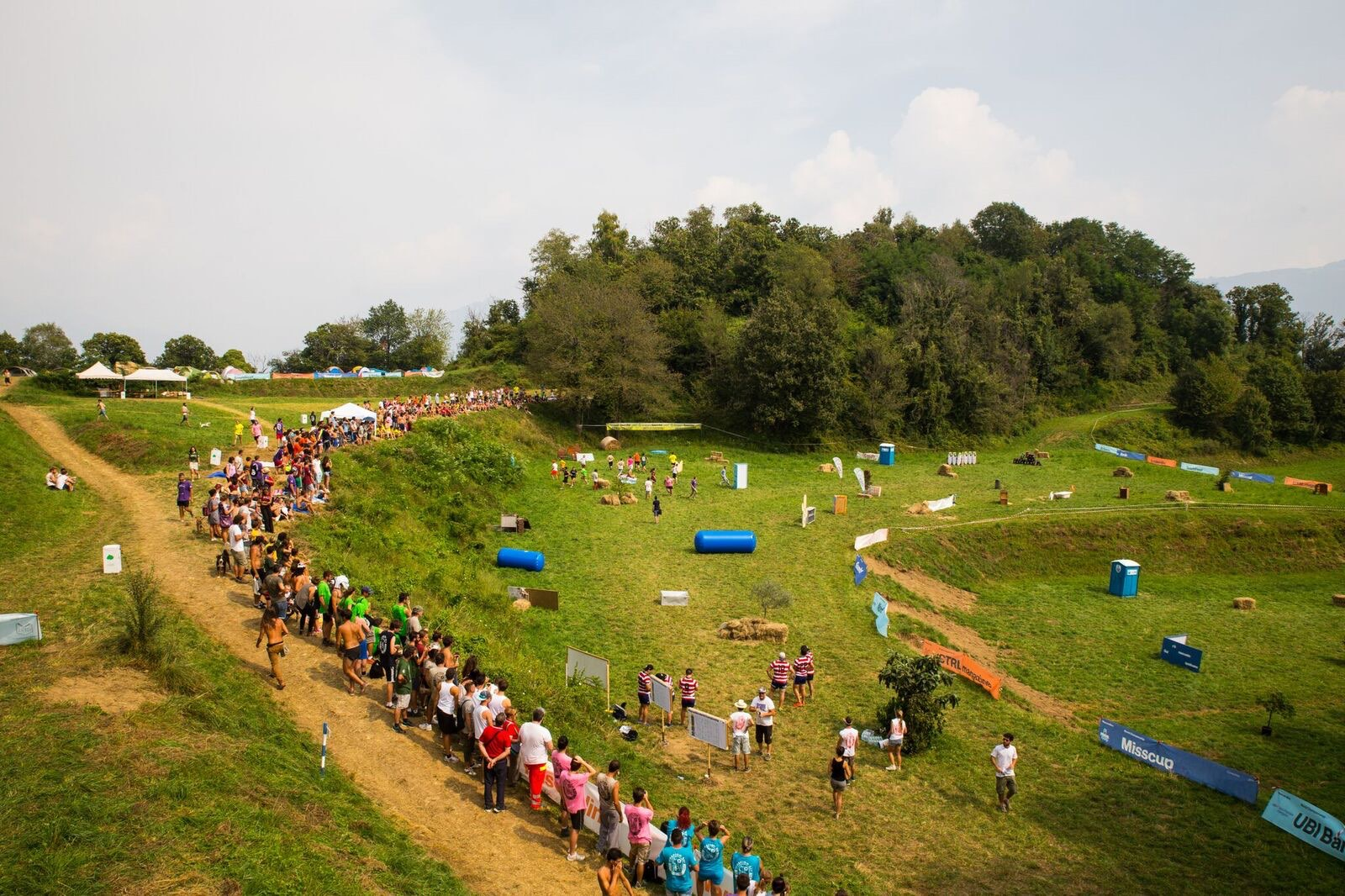
Nascondino World Championship 2016, in Consonno, Italy

The winning team was awarded "The Golden Fig Leaf", which is biblically the symbol of hiding, referring to the story of Adam and Eve.

Yasuo Hazaki, a graduate of Nippon Sport Science University, and professor of media studies at Josai University in Sakado, Japan, had set up a campaign in 2013 to promote hide-and-seek for the 2020 Olympics in Tokyo. The game Hazaki was promoting was a slightly different traditional Japanese game, more similar to a game of tag. Hazaki contacted the Nascondino World Championship organizers and said that nascondino rules were more appropriate to be a candidate to the Olympics.

== See also ==
- Princess and monster game
- Search game
- Sepak Tekong
