= Caught stealing =

Baseball statistic

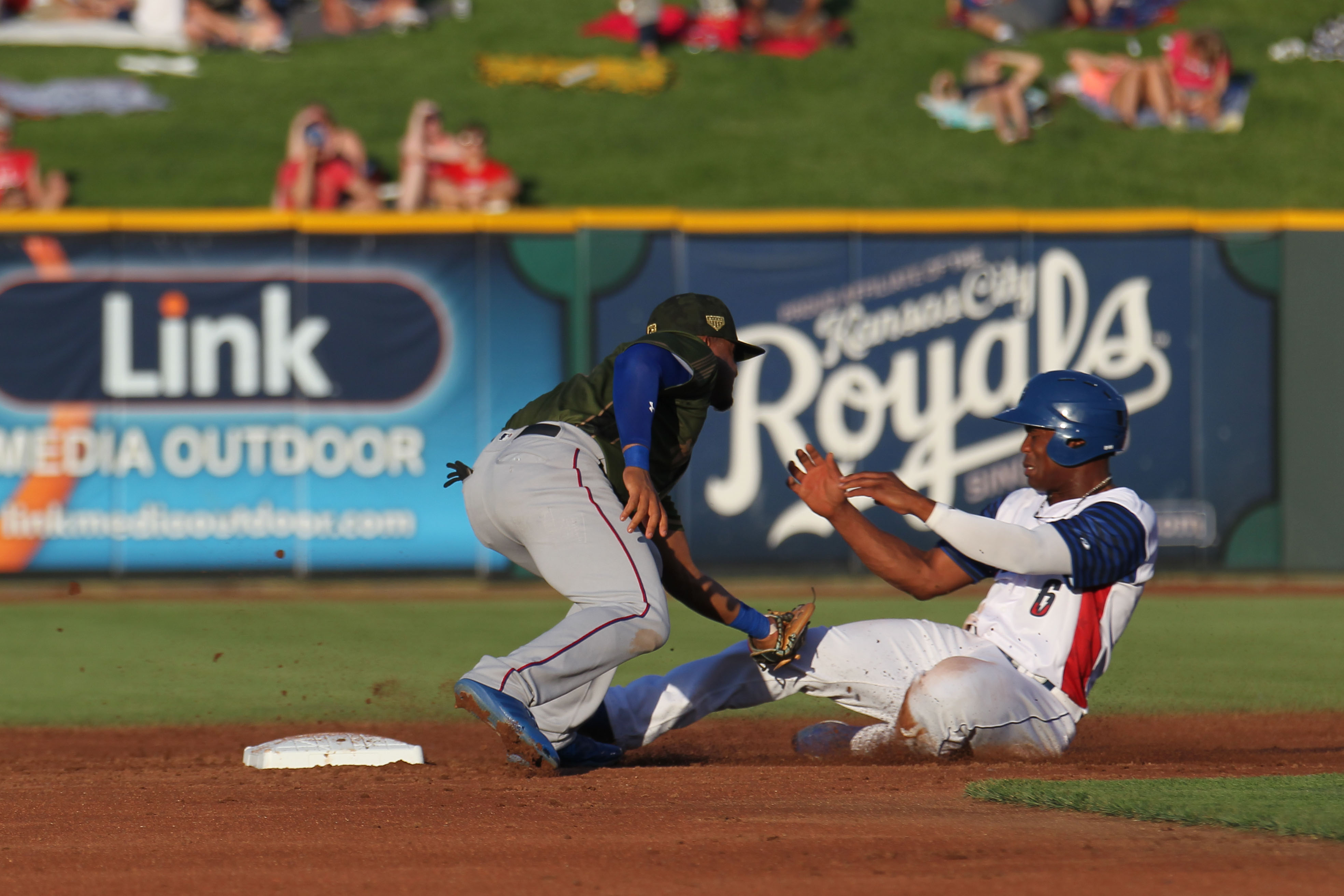
A baserunner (at right) caught stealing

In baseball, a runner is charged, and the fielders involved are credited, with a time caught stealing when the runner attempts to advance or lead off from one base to another without the ball being batted and then is tagged out by a fielder while making the attempt. The runner is said to be caught stealing or thrown out. A time caught stealing cannot be charged to a batter-runner, a runner who is still advancing as the direct result of reaching base. In baseball statistics, caught stealing is denoted by CS. It may be the result of a rundown.

Major League Baseball (MLB) began tracking caught stealing in 1951. The official MLB rules specify that a time caught stealing is charged when:

- a runner, attempting a stolen base, is put out;
- a runner is caught in a rundown play while stealing, and is tagged out; or
- a runner, attempting a stolen base, is safe because a fielder is charged with an error on catching the ball, and in the judgment of the official scorer, the runner would have been out if the ball had been caught. (This official scoring is almost never made; an error is usually only charged if a bad throw or catch allows the runner to take an additional base, e.g., the runner attempts to steal second, the ball goes into the outfield, and the runner takes third as well. In such an instance the runner is credited with a steal of second, with the error accounting for the advance to third.)

Rickey Henderson is the MLB all-time leader in getting caught stealing (335 times). The active leader is Starling Marte with 98 times caught.

== Pickoffs ==
A baserunner is "picked off" base when that runner takes a lead off his base and the pitcher (or catcher) makes a quick throw to a fielder manning that base, resulting in the runner being tagged out. In this circumstance, the baserunner is not considered to have been caught stealing. However, if, during the play, the runner made any feint or motion toward the next base, then the runner is caught stealing, even if he is eventually caught trying to re-assume the base which he originally occupied.

== Wild pitch and passed ball ==
If a runner is making no attempt to advance to the next base until there is a wild pitch or passed ball, and is then put out trying to advance to the next base, this runner is not caught stealing. If the wild pitch/passed ball is an uncaught third strike (with the batter reaching base safely), and the runner is thrown out instead of the batter, then the runner is put on a fielder's choice. If it is not an uncaught third strike, then the runner is simply out on a standard put out, and a wild pitch/passed ball would not be charged to the pitcher or catcher.

== Records ==
Rickey Henderson, the all-time stolen base leader with 1,406 steals, holds the major league and American League records for being caught stealing. Henderson was caught stealing 335 times in his career, including a record 293 times in the American League. Lou Brock, who ranks second on the all-time stolen base list and holds the National League record for career steals with 938, also holds the National League record for times caught stealing. Brock, who spent his entire career in the National League, was caught stealing 307 times.

Henderson also holds the major league and American League records for being caught stealing in a single season. He was thrown out 42 times in 1982, when he also set the post-1900 record for steals in a season with 130. (Hugh Nicol set the all-time record for steals with 138 in 1887 when he played for the Cincinnati Red Stockings of the American Association. Caught stealing records were not kept then.) Miller Huggins set the single season caught stealing record in the National League in 1914, when he was thrown out 36 times (although he did steal 32 bases that year).

Robby Thompson of the San Francisco Giants was the first player in major league history to be caught stealing four times in one game. This occurred against the Cincinnati Reds on June 27, 1986.
