= Left fielder =

Defensive position in baseball

The position of the left fielder

In baseball, a left fielder, abbreviated LF, is an outfielder who plays defense in left field. Left field is the area of the outfield to the left of a person standing at home plate and facing towards the pitcher's mound. In the numbering system used to record defensive plays, the left fielder is assigned the number seven.

== Position description ==
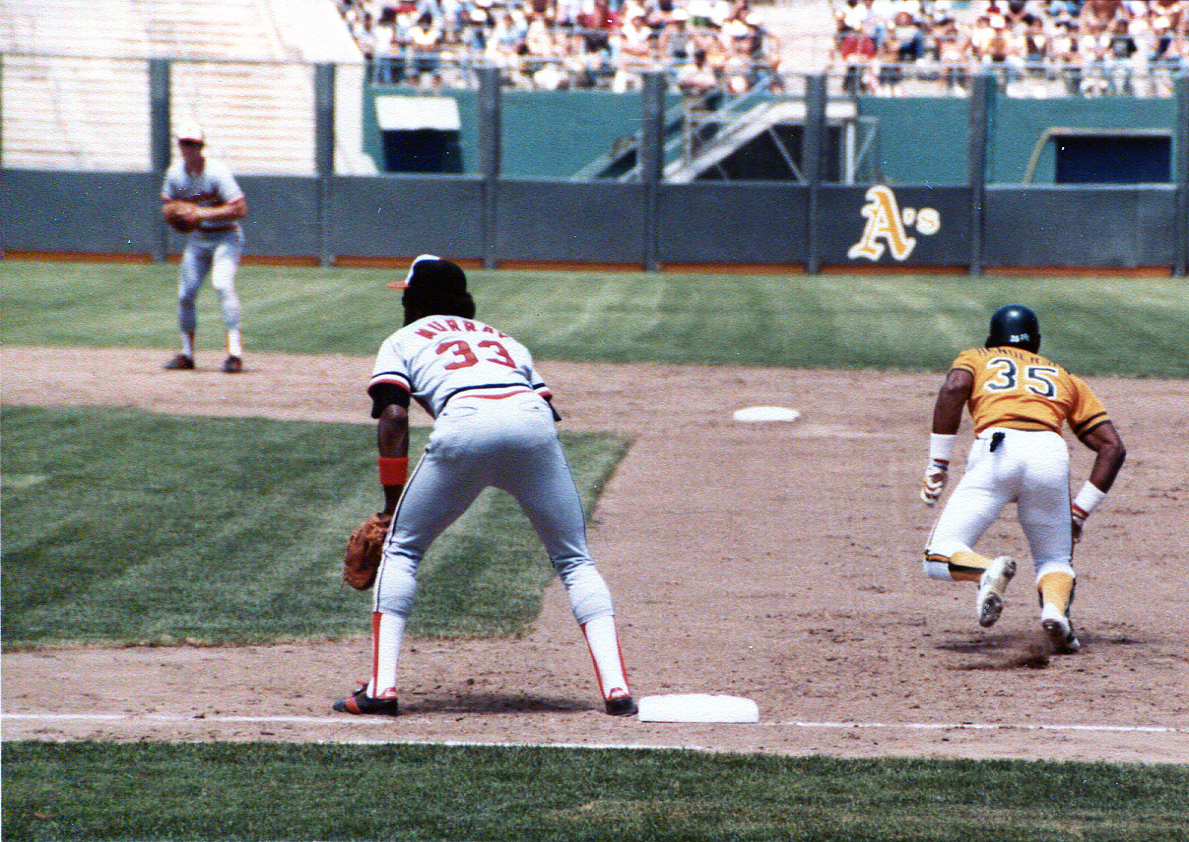
Hall of fame left fielder Rickey Henderson attempting a steal. Henderson holds both the single season and career stolen base records.

Of all outfielders, the left fielder often will have the weakest arm, as they generally do not need to throw the ball as far to prevent the advance of any baserunners, especially at third base. The left fielder still requires good fielding and catching skills, and tends to receive more balls than the right fielder because right-handed hitters tend to "pull" the ball into left field. Right-handed players have a slight fielding advantage in left field because their hardest defensive plays will be along the third-base foul line, to the fielder's right. Right-handed players can throw the ball back to the infield harder and faster since the ball is already on the right side of their bodies.

=== Defensive roles ===
Outfielders have a critical off-ball role as well: backing up the other fielders when a ball is hit or thrown to them. When a ground ball is hit to the left side of the field, the left fielder will run behind the third baseman or shortstop in case the ball gets by them. On bunts, pickoffs and in rundowns, the left fielder backs up or covers third base. Similarly, when a runner is stealing third base, the left fielder will back up the throw from the catcher in case the throw misses third base. Left fielders also back up third base when a ball is thrown from right field, and back up center field when a pop fly is hit into left-center field.

Left fielders defer to center fielders on fly balls, as the center fielder is generally the better defender of the two. Managers often place their powerful hitters in left field since defensive ability is less important there.

== Hall of Fame left fielders ==
The following are baseball players inducted to the National Baseball Hall of Fame as left fielders:

- Lou Brock
- Jesse Burkett
- Fred Clarke
- Ed Delahanty
- Goose Goslin
- Chick Hafey

- Rickey Henderson
- Monte Irvin
- Joe Kelley
- Ralph Kiner
- Heinie Manush
- Joe Medwick

- Stan Musial
- Jim O'Rourke
- Tim Raines
- Jim Rice
- Al Simmons

- Willie Stargell
- Zack Wheat
- Billy Williams
- Ted Williams
- Carl Yastrzemski

== See also ==
- Baseball Hall of Fame
- Gold Glove Award
