= Variations of baseball =

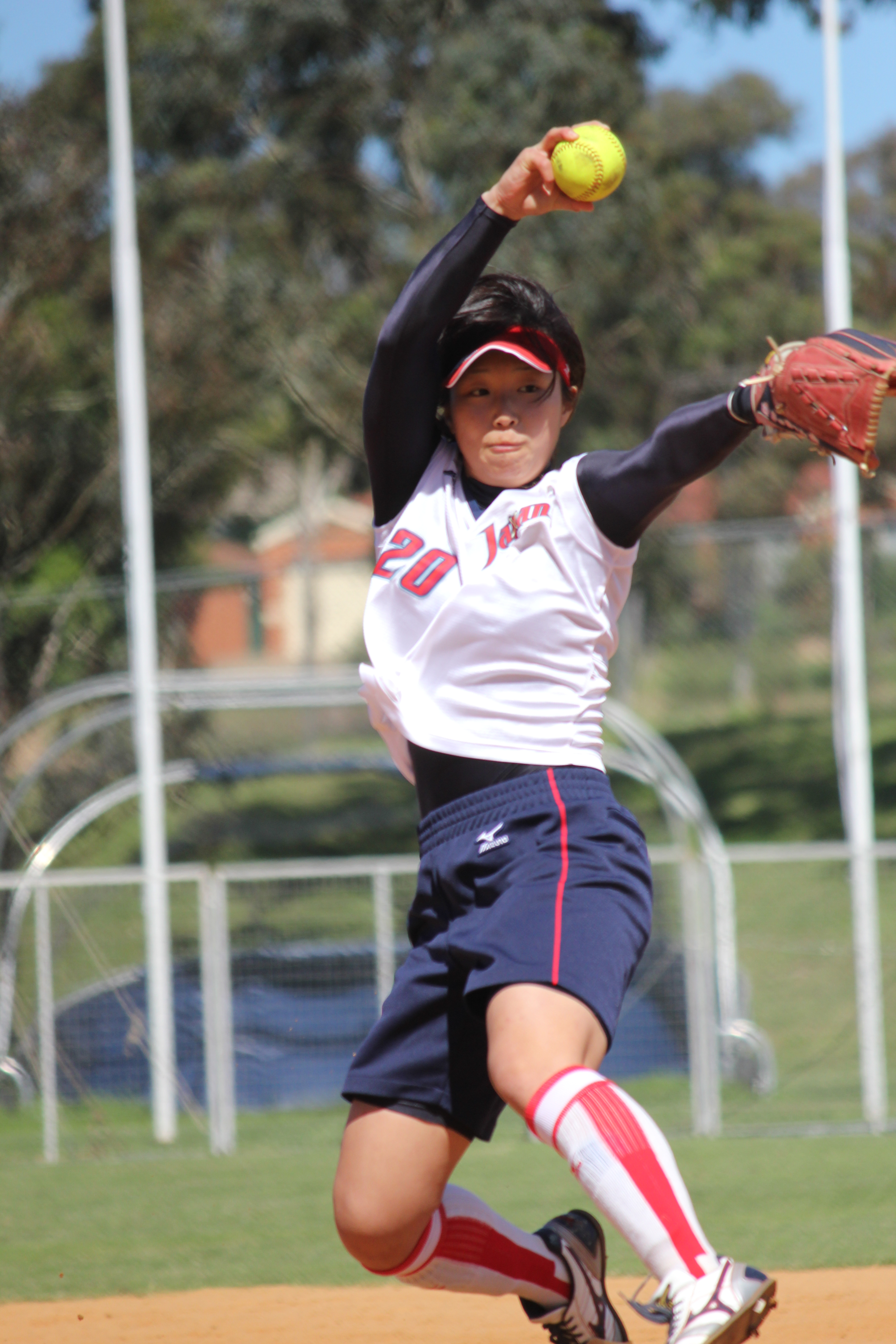
Softball pitcher about to deliver the ball underarm.

In sports, the term diamond sports refers to recreational (often scaled down) variants of baseball, a bat-and-ball sport. The most popular and closely related sport to baseball is softball, with the two sports being administered internationally by the World Baseball Softball Confederation (WBSC), alongside Baseball5.

Many variations of baseball change the game significantly. For example, many variations are played informally, with less equipment or space requirements and a softer ball, and certain variations do not feature a pitcher or have the batters hit the ball using their hands or feet, with failure to legally hit the ball on the first opportunity resulting in an automatic out. There may be a lack of baserunning, with base hits awarded according to the distance or number of bounces the batted ball takes before being fielded, and imaginary "invisible runners" advancing around the bases in lieu of actual runners.

There are also some bat-and-ball sports which are distinct from baseball, such as rounders, that strongly resemble it.

== History ==
=== Early history ===
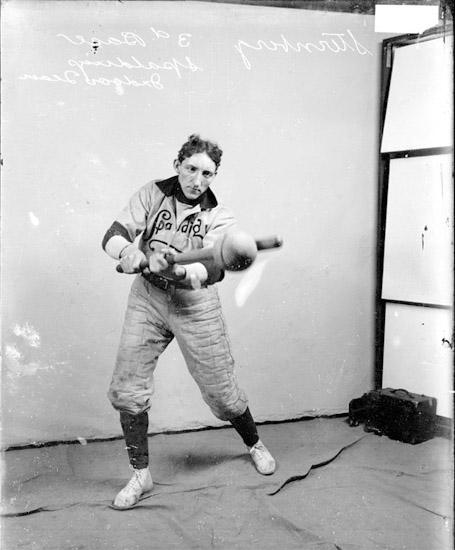
1907 depiction of indoor baseball, which eventually evolved into softball

Early versions of baseball had regional variations in different parts of the United States, until the modern standard (the "New York game"), codified in and evolving from the 1845 Knickerbocker Rules, became the main form of baseball after the 1860s Civil War.

Certain aspects of modern baseball were completely missing in these early variants; for example, the pitcher was expected to make it easy for the batter to hit the ball, and the usual fielding configuration saw most of the infielders standing on their bases. Some features of these variants can still be found in modern baseball variants, such as the use of underarm pitching in softball, or batters hitting with the hand (as in punchball) rather than a bat. Other historical variants coincided with rule changes made to the game in its early history; for example, baseball played on ice in the late 19th century may have led to batters being allowed to overrun first base, and arguments for ten-person baseball teams were made at the time that the "fair foul" was permitted.

=== Adaptation ===
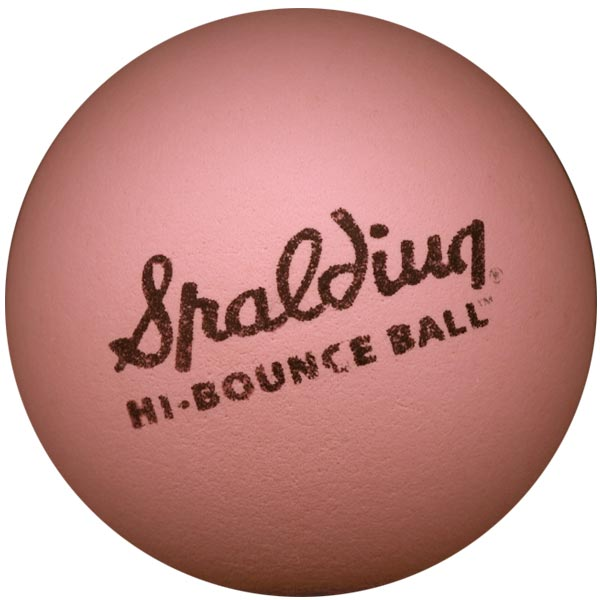
A rubber spaldeen, used in many street baseball variants

The difficulty of affording and acquiring standard equipment, particularly in pre-industrial America, saw the rules be altered in several ways by children playing with roughshod equipment; for example, when catchers played without a mask, they would often stand further back from the plate, and stealing of home or even other bases was often prohibited. Sticks or stones could be used to mark the bases, making the game easy to set up and participate in.

Baseball, as the historical national pastime of America, inspired many variants. Many variations of baseball were invented in urban areas, where space was limited; immigrants in the inner city often adapted to American life by playing such games. These variants were often played with a spaldeen ball; for example, punchball's popularity derived partially from the fact that it was played with nothing more than a rubber ball and the fact that it didn't carry the same risk of losing the ball or breaking windows as baseball. The ball used could even be as simple as a rolled-up set of socks (known as a sockball) or a taped-up wad of paper. Features of the city streets, such as the manhole covers for the sewers, were often involved in the regulations of such games. (For other examples of urban American games, see: Traditional games of New York City).

=== Contemporary era ===
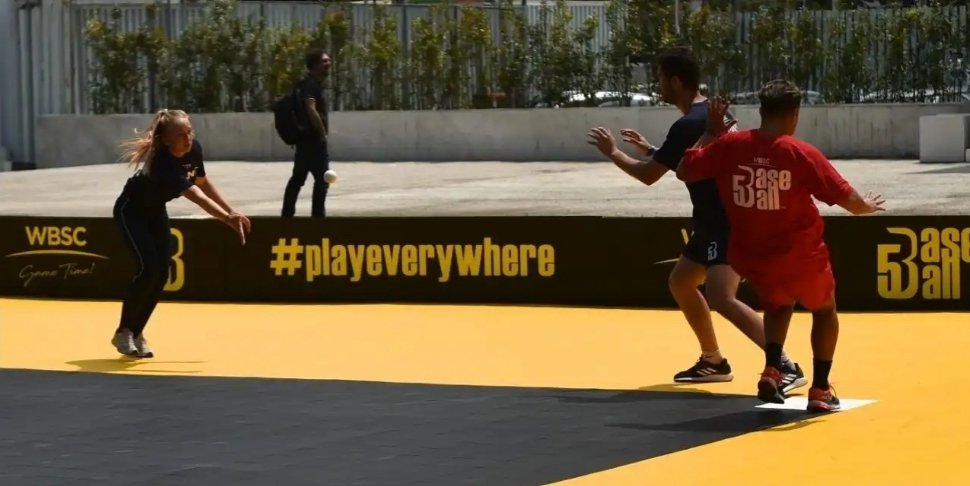
Baseball5's first international competition was held in 2018 at Rome's Foro Italico

In the 21st century, the WBSC has promoted several variations of baseball at the international level. Softball became part of the WBSC's offerings at the time of its 2014 formation, when the International Baseball Federation merged with the International Softball Federation. Baseball5, a highly simplified version of baseball, was started in 2017 as a way to reach new fans. In 2020, the WBSC accepted baseball e-sport as one of its official disciplines.

At the professional level, Banana Ball has achieved significant popularity by making several exhibition-style modifications to the rules of baseball.

== Historic variations ==
=== Massachusetts Game ===
The Massachusetts Game (also known as "round ball" because it was played on a circular field) was a competitor to what would eventually become the basis for modern baseball, the "New York Game". Some major differences of this game from baseball are:

- The batter stood halfway between home plate and first base, with the pitcher only about half the distance from the batter as in baseball.
- There was no foul territory, so the batter could hit the ball in any direction.
- Instead of tagging runners, the fielders threw the ball at the runners in a practice that was known as "soaking" or "plugging".
- Instead of a nine-inning game, the team that scored 100 runs first won the game; this would often take a day or more to occur.

== Olympic sports ==
=== Softball ===
Softball originated as a variation of baseball, and today is a very popular sport in its own right, with most of the rules remaining the same as baseball. The field is significantly smaller, with the bases only 60 feet (18 m) apart, and the pitcher is required to throw the ball underarm throughout the seven regulation innings of play. Softball is administered at the international level along with baseball by the World Baseball Softball Confederation, with the two sports being treated as disciplines of the same overall sport when played at the Olympics. Alongside the Olympic discipline of fastpitch softball, which is the most popular variation of softball, there is also modified fastpitch softball and slow-pitch softball.

=== Baseball5 ===
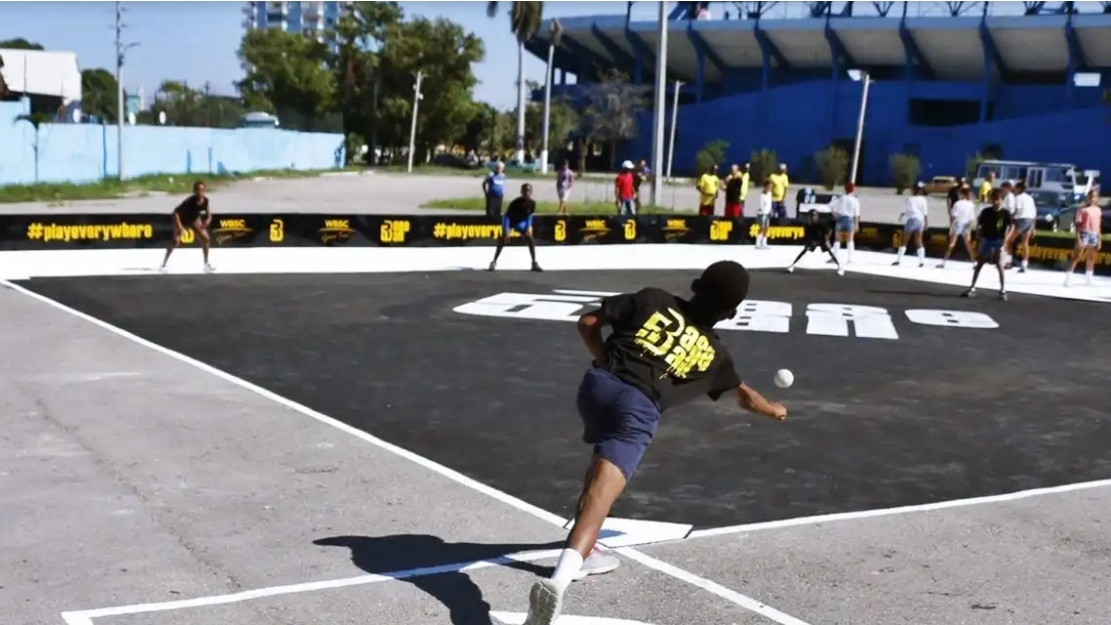
A B5 batter hitting the ball into play.

Baseball5 (B5) is an international variation of baseball where the only equipment used is a rubber ball, and the field is a 21 m (69 ft)-square. Batters "self-serve" the ball, hitting it with a bare hand to start each play, with foul balls and out-of-the-park home runs not permitted. Each team has only five players and there are five innings in the game. It is scheduled to be played at the 2026 Youth Olympic Games, and is administered by the World Baseball Softball Confederation.

== Informal variations ==
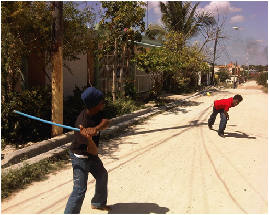
Kids playing Vitilla.

These variations of baseball generally reduce the amount of equipment and space needed to play the game, and the ball is often softer to reduce the risk of injury. They may also be modified to work with fewer players; for example, some informal variations of baseball use the invisible runner rule, simulating having runners on base when a player must take their turn to bat. However, the basic structure of a pitcher throwing to a batter, with the batter hitting the ball with some type of bat, is retained.

=== Stickball ===
In stickball, the bat is a broom handle, and the ball is generally a rubber ball or tennis ball. It is generally played as a street game.

==== Vitilla ====
Vitilla is a variation of stickball played mostly in the Dominican Republic. Instead of a ball, a large plastic water bottle cap is thrown towards the batter, and there are only two bases to advance around before going to home plate. In addition, the strike zone is represented by a physical object behind the batter.

=== Little League Baseball ===
Little League Baseball modifies some of the rules of baseball and softball to be more appropriate for children. It is played at an official level.

=== Blitzball ===
Blitzball is played with a ball similar to a wiffle ball, which curves more when pitched and travels further when hit than a regular baseball. There are only 2 to 3 players on each team, and games last 3 innings. It was started around 2010.

=== Wiffle ball ===
Wiffle ball is played with a plastic bat and ball. The ball is designed to have more movement in the air, so that pitchers can more easily trick batters with different types of pitches.

=== Corkball ===
Corkball does not feature baserunning: the value of a hit is measured by the distance traveled by the batted ball. The advancement of "invisible runners" placed on base is how runs are scored.

=== Banana Ball ===
Banana Ball is a proprietary baseball code invented by the Savannah Bananas. Its rules focus on sports entertainment.

== Games with no pitcher ==
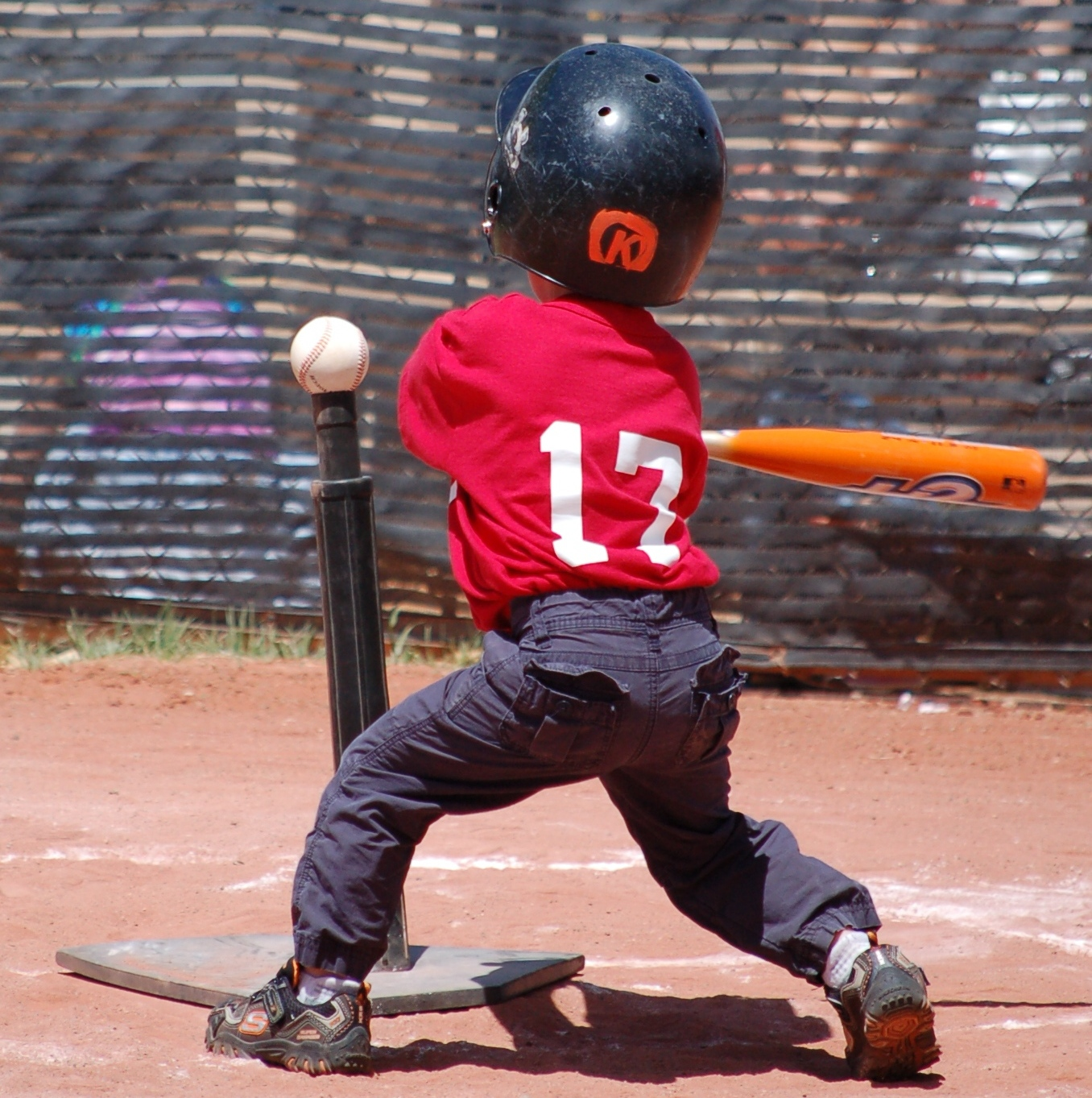
T-ball player swinging at the ball placed on the tee.

The following variations of baseball do not have a pitcher, meaning that the batter starts every play with possession of the ball. They may feature strikes, or the batter may automatically be out for failing to legally hit the ball into fair territory.

=== Tee-ball ===
Tee-ball is a popular introductory variant of baseball for children, with the ball placed on a "batting tee" each time a batter is prepared to hit. The batter hits the ball off the tee to commence play. Older players may be given the opportunity to face some pitches from their coach, making it easier for them to hit the ball while still helping them to progress toward facing an opposing pitcher. Each inning may be played until three outs, or until all players on the offensive team have had a turn to bat.

== Games with no bat ==
The following games involve the use of either the hands or the legs in order to hit the ball.

=== Kickball ===
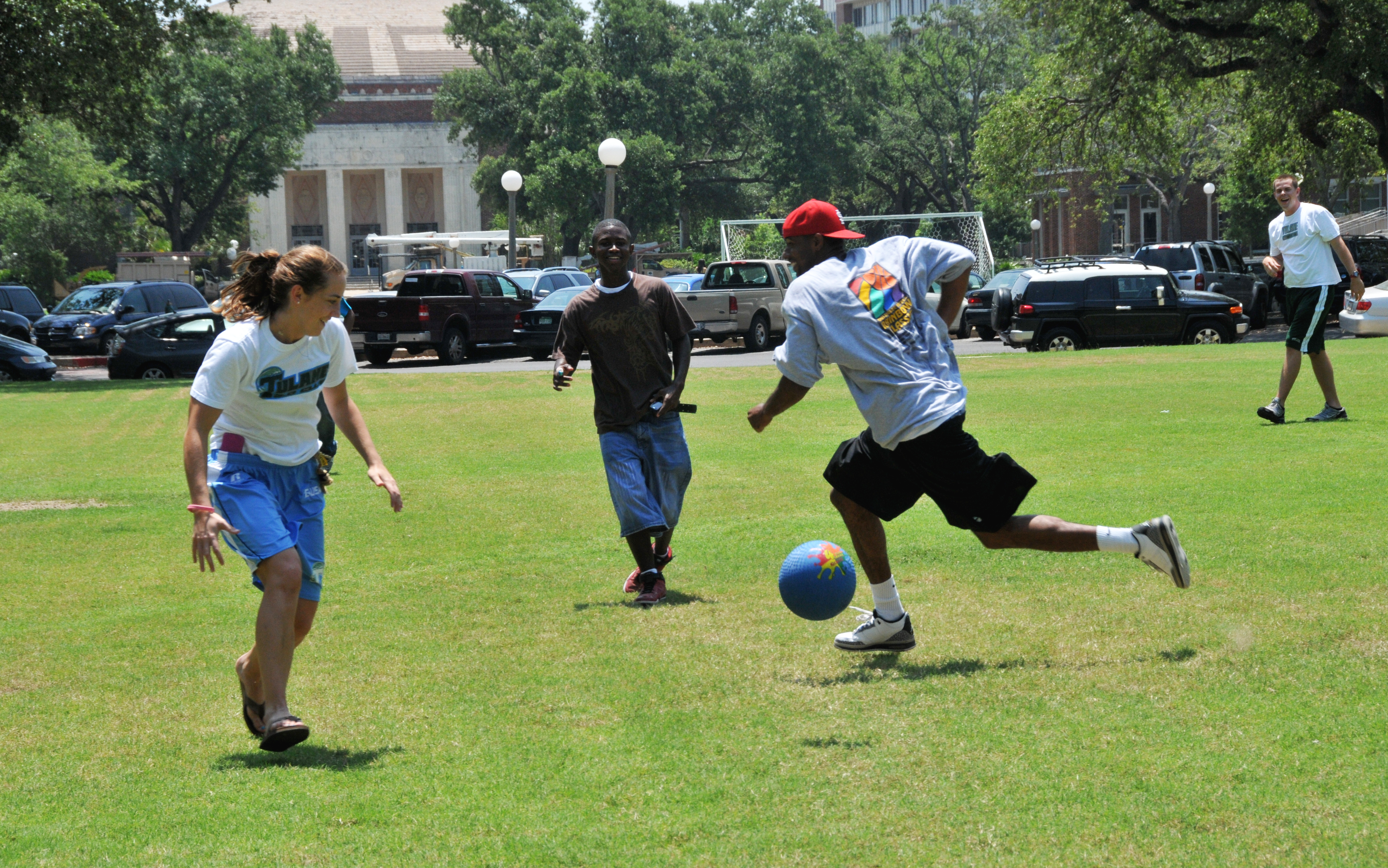
People playing Kickball.

Kickball is a popular variation of baseball, which involves batters kicking the ball with their legs. The ball is thrown underhand by the pitcher, and must roll to the batter.

==== Matball ====
Matball, also known as Big Base, is a variation of kickball where multiple runners can be on a base, with the bases being large mats.

=== Variations of Baseball5 ===
Baseball5 is a variation of baseball which does not have several elements of conventional baseball, such as pitchers and bats.

==== Punchball ====
Punchball/slapball is played with the hands: batters start each play off by hitting the ball into play using their bare hands. There is no pitcher.

==== Cuatro esquinas ====
Cuatro esquinas (transl. four corners) is a Cuban street game that inspired the creation of Baseball5.

==== Pelotica de goma ====
Pelotica de goma is a Venezuelan street game which has been played for over 70 years.

== Unorthodox variations ==
=== Banana Ball ===
Banana Ball is a proprietary, alternative version of baseball developed by the Savannah Bananas and in implemented in their own league, the Banana Ball Championship League. The rule changes force a faster pace of play, allow for spectator interaction, and encourages gameplay that incorporates humorous and entertainment-focused moments.

=== Box baseball ===
Three boxes are drawn on the ground between the "pitcher" and "batter". The pitcher has to toss the ball underhand so that it bounces in the box closest to the batter, who then has to try to hit it (with their hand) back into the box nearest to the pitcher without letting the pitcher catch the ball. The box in the middle is considered foul territory, and neither player is allowed to step into the boxes after hitting/pitching. Bases are awarded according to how many bounces the ball takes after being hit by the batter and before being caught by the pitcher, with the game played to 9 innings.

=== Beep baseball ===
Beep baseball is generally played by visually impaired or blind players, using a ball that beeps so that it can be located more easily. There are "spotters" who assist the fielders by indicating which section of the field the batted ball has been hit into. The game is played to six innings.

=== Dartball ===
Dartball is played using a dartboard, with the results of each throw of the dart relating to the rules of baseball. "Batters" simulate an at-bat, with the dart's landing position on the board determining whether they get a ball or strike, and whether they ultimately reach base/advance runners already on base.

=== Over-the-line ===
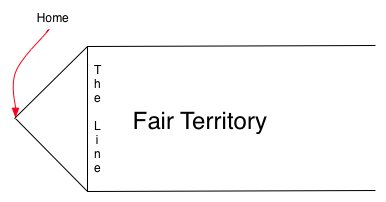
Over-the-line field

Over-the-line (OTL) is a variation requiring only three players per team, and is played without gloves in some gender/age divisions. The batter stands at the point of a triangle, with his goal being to hit the ball (pitched by a teammate) over the opposing line of the triangle without the ball being caught by a defender. The fair territory is designated by two parallel lines emanating at right angles from the two corners of the triangle away from the batter. There is no baserunning, with runs scored when there are either 3+ "base hits" (uncaught fair balls) in an inning, or a "home run" (a ball landing past the furthest fielder).

=== Stoop ball ===
Stoop ball is a variation where the ball is thrown by the batter at the steps of a stoop (concrete stairway) with the goal of making the rebounded ball travel away from the fielders. Bases or points are awarded based generally on the distance or number of bounces the ball takes before it is fielded.

== Training drills ==
=== Hotbox ===
Hotbox is a baseball drill or mini-game that can be played with three or more players and two to four bases. The variation with only two bases can also be called pickle, rundown, or running bases. In the drill, one fielder plays near each of the bases and the rest of the players are runners, who begin on any base. The fielders proceed to throw the ball to each other, playing catch. At any time, a runner may attempt to run to the next or previous base. The fielders then attempt to throw to each other and tag that runner out. If a runner is tagged out (either once or three times), he then becomes a fielder, and the fielder who tagged him out becomes a runner. Runners count how many bases they reach safely, and the player with the most bases when the group decides to quit, wins. If there are three or more bases, the runners may run in either direction.

Runners will often get into a rundown or "hotbox". The fielders must use teamwork and skill to put the runners out. Errors usually happen as well, where the fielders must contend as the runners scramble to earn additional bases.

Fielders must take care not to hit the runners with a thrown ball. Some players may choose to devise a penalty for hitting a runner with a ball, such as a deduction in the fielder's own score. Batter's helmets are recommended. If it is too difficult for runners to advance safely, the bases can be spaced closer together to shift the balance; conversely, bases further apart give the fielders an advantage (assuming they can throw well).

== Related bat-and-ball sports ==
=== Pesäpallo ===
Pesäpallo field diagram. (Note the irregular placement of the bases.)

Pesäpallo, also known as Finnish baseball, was invented in the 1920s, with some of it being based on baseball. It has four bases placed at increasing distances between each other (such that the distance between 3rd base and home is greater than between home and 1st base.) The ball is pitched "vertically" to the batter (such that it is thrown upwards by the opposing pitcher at home base), and is hit as it lands. The game features a number of significant differences to baseball: it is not possible to hit out-of-the-park home runs, as these are considered foul balls, and batters do not have to run on fair contact, being allowed three chances to hit the ball (regardless of the result of each hit) before being forced.

=== Rounders ===
Rounders involves a similar hitting of a thrown ball as baseball, with a "rounder" being scored upon rounding all four bases. There is no foul territory, so that the ball can be hit in any direction. It is popular in the United Kingdom among school children, having been played since the 1700s.

=== Cricket variants with similarities to baseball ===
==== Ball in Play ====
Ball in Play (BiP) is an indoor form of cricket which includes elements of baseball. It was started by Jomboy Media in collaboration with Major League Cricket in order to help American baseball fans learn cricket.

==== Vigoro ====
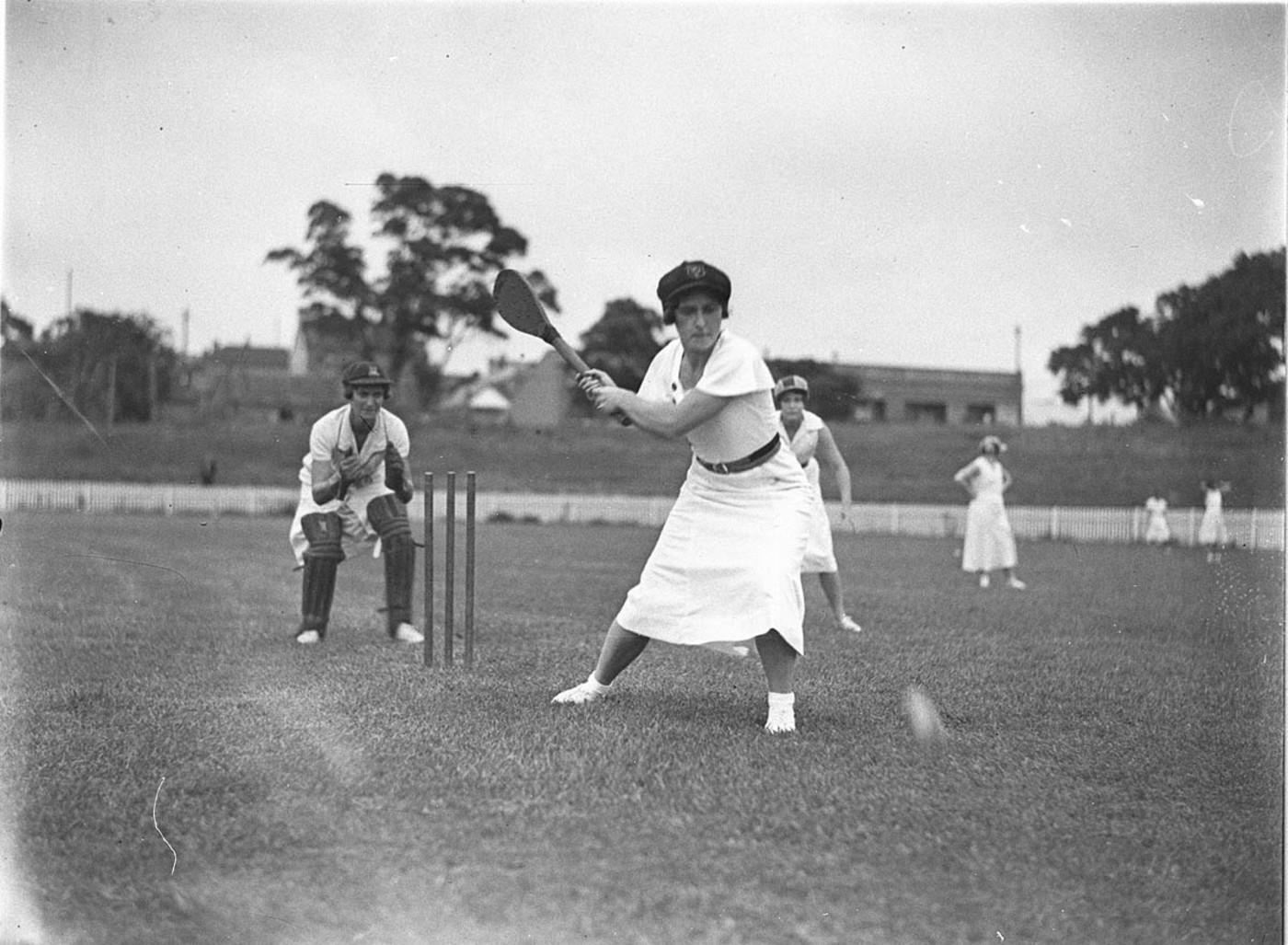
Vigoro players in action at the wicket, circa 1929

Vigoro is a team sport, played mainly by women in Australia, that originally combined elements of cricket and tennis, although in its current form it may be more similar to cricket and baseball.

== See also ==
- Forms of cricket
