= Traditional games of Venezuela =

Fading culture

Venezuela has some traditional games and activities, though many are fading away because of foreign influences.

== Traditional games ==
=== Bolas criollas ===
Participants compete to throw heavy metal balls as close as possible to a smaller metal ball.

=== Carruchas ===
Participants compete to race on the streets in the city of Caracas on sleds known as carruchas.

=== Coleo ===
In coleo or colos torreados, four participants ride on horseback and try to bring down a bull as fast as possible.

=== Gurrufío ===
Gurrufío is a 400-year old game.

=== Pelotica de goma ===
Pelotica de goma (transl. little rubber ball) is a variation of baseball in which the only equipment used is a rubber ball. The batter starts off with the ball, hits it with a hand, and then begins running the bases, with the rest of the gameplay being similar to baseball. Baseball5 is a similar sport created by the World Baseball Softball Confederation which was partially inspired by this game. Pelotica de goma is also used to close the hueco del desagüe.
