= Invisible runner rule =

Device used in baseball-style games

An invisible runner, or ghost runner, is a device used in variations of baseball, including softball, stickball, and kickball, when a team does not have enough players. Used primarily in schoolyard games, the rule is called into action when a live runner on base is next in line to bat. The specifics of the rule vary regionally, and are often negotiated prior to the start of the game.

== Running the bases ==
Unlike a live baserunner, an invisible runner cannot steal a base, but can, depending on rules, advance on a wild pitch. However, this may not be worthwhile unless the runner is on third, as they may need to be forced to their next base, depending on the rule variation used.

An invisible runner normally travels at the speed of the current batter. For example, assume an invisible runner on first base while the batter hits the ball. If the fielding team reaches second base before the batter reaches first base, the invisible runner is out. Otherwise, the invisible runner is considered safe. Similarly, an invisible runner advances only as many bases as the actual runner. For example, if an invisible runner is on second base and the batter hits a single to the outfield, the invisible runner only proceeds to third, even though a physical runner would often score in a similar scenario.

If a player on offense is not the batter, they must take the place of last invisible runner (e.g., if there are invisible runners on first and second, the new player moves to first) and they are then the cause that "pushes" the invisible runners ahead of them the same number of bases that they reach, and the invisible runner travels at the forward runner's speed.

In another variation of the rule, some play that the invisible runner has to be "forced" in—that stipulation means that there is no base available. Under this rule, the invisible runner on second would only advance to third on a double because they were not technically forced to score.

== Becoming an invisible runner ==
If the team playing offense does not have enough players to continue, the next player at bat is replaced by an invisible runner. Typically, the live runner must verbally announce: “invisible runner on _______ base”, or “ghost runner on _______”, before they can walk off base. Should the runner not make the announcement, they are liable to be tagged out by the opposing team.

== See also ==
- Special batting order situation in Baseball5
