= Over-the-line =

Variant of softball played mostly in Southern California

Over-the-line is a bat-and-ball sport, a game related to baseball and softball. Like those games, it involves a batter, pitcher, and fielders. Since a game requires only three people per team, it is considerably easier to organize an informal game. The equipment consists of a rope (or lines marked in the sand), an "official" softball bat & an "official" Orange rubber DeBeer softball. No gloves are allowed while fielding in the Men's divisions unless 60+ years of age. However, gloves are allowed for the women's divisions. Junior (typically 20 years or below) events also allow a glove on defense. A single golf glove may be used when batting. Gameplay, however, is very different.

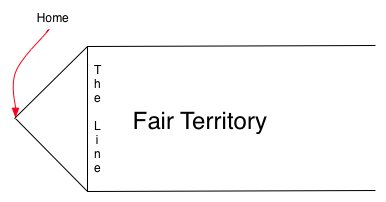
A diagram of an Over-The-Line court

The name "over-the-line" is a registered trademark of the Old Mission Beach Athletic Club (OMBAC) of San Diego, California, which organizes an annual tournament that is one of the city's largest summer social events. It is also known as OTL (also trademarked by OMBAC). OMBAC allows other organizations to license the trademark for their own events for a nominal fee.

An over-the-line court is normally made up on a beach and comprises a triangle and an open-ended rectangle marked by ropes or lines in the sand. The base ("The Line") of the triangle is 55 feet (17 m) long, and the distance from the line to the opposite point ("Home") is also 55 feet (17 m). The rectangle is composed of two parallel ropes or lines that extend out indefinitely away from home starting from the two ends of The Line and at a right angle to The Line. The area between the parallel ropes and over The Line is fair territory. Everything other than the triangle and fair territory is foul territory.

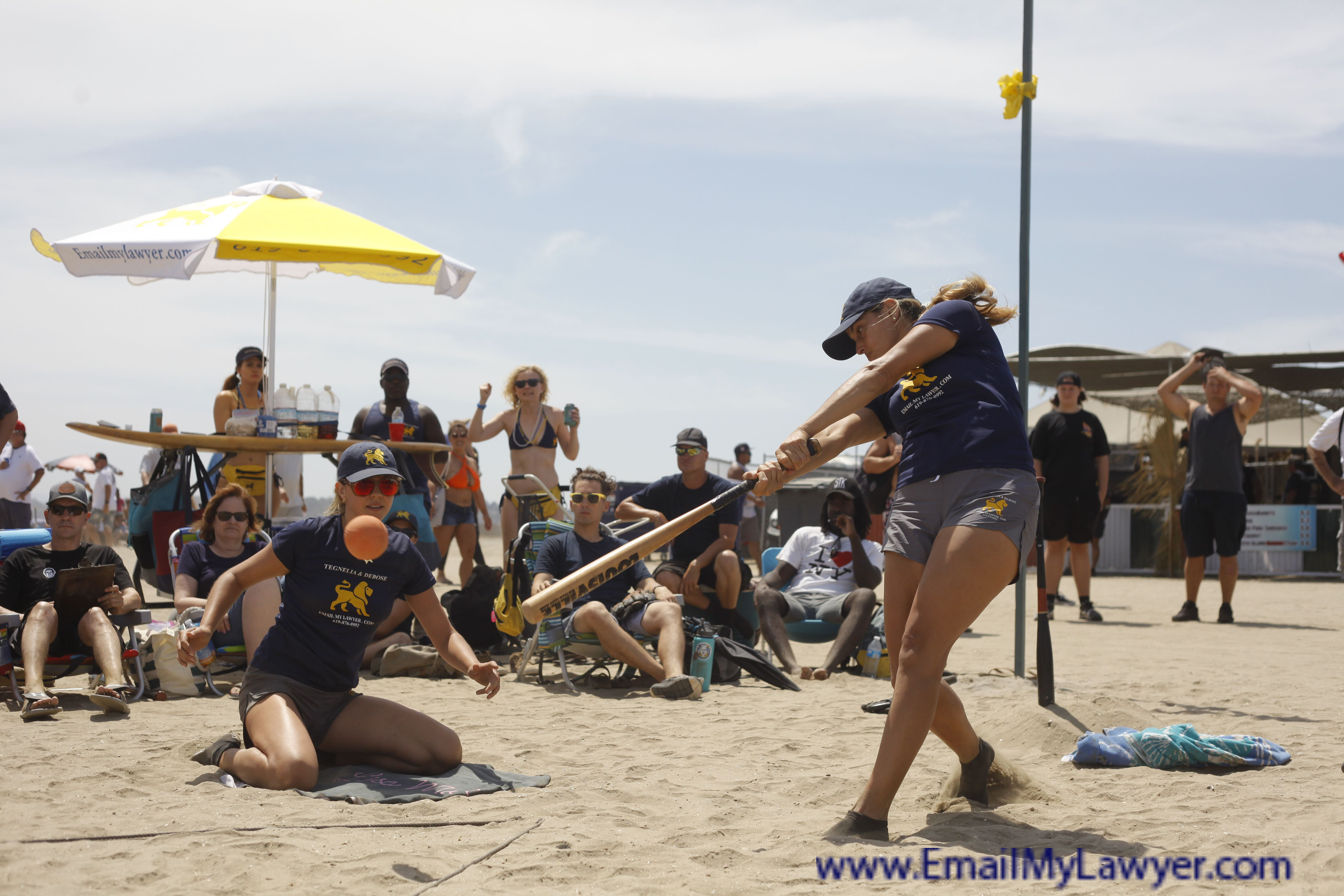
Pitching and Batting

Unlike in softball, the batter and pitcher are on the same team. The batter stands at Home and the pitcher stands anywhere in front of The Line, not in the triangle. Fielders (the other team) stand behind The Line, in fair territory. The objective for the batter is to hit the ball into fair territory without a fielder catching it. A hit may also be made when the fielder who catches the ball crosses over the line (or the line's extension) or drops the ball in either fair or foul territory. No bases are physically run, however.

An out is made if (a) the ball is hit into the triangle, (b) a batter gets a strike (swings and completely misses), (c) the defenders catch the ball without crossing over The Line or its extensions, (d) a batter has two fouls (a foul is a ball that lands in foul territory, a pitch taken at or a balk), (e) a player bats out of order, or (f) either the pitcher or batter touches, but does not catch a struck ball (if the pitcher or batter catches it, there is a no pitch). Unlike baseball and softball, where the foul lines are in fair territory, the ropes are in foul territory. Three outs end the half-inning, as in regular baseball and softball.

The scoring system is as follows:

1. The third hit in an inning scores one run and each subsequent hit scores another run and
2. A home run (a ball that lands past the Fielder furthest from The Line, not over, just needs to be past) without it being touched by a Fielder scores a run and the unscored hits that preceded it. The hits are then reset to zero.

== Annual tournament ==
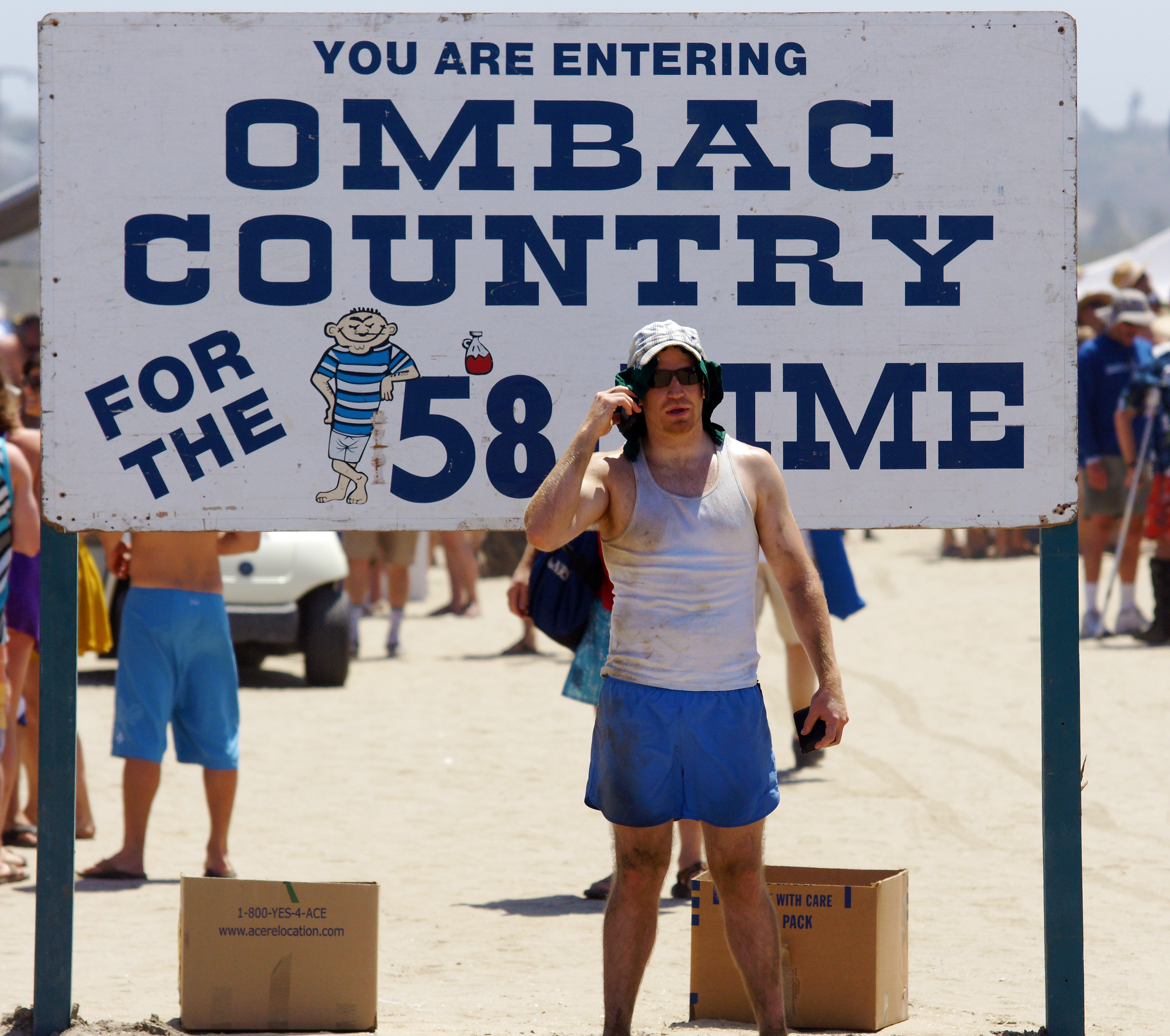
Old Mission Beach Athletic Club sign at the Over the Line event

Over-the-line was first played in Mission Beach in San Diego, California, in the 1950s and continues to thrive in the area. It is seen largely as a novelty game in the inland counties (and, debatably, the beach counties as well), but still persists as a physical education activity at local high schools, and most visibly in the practice of an annual tournament held on Fiesta Island. By far the locale's most notorious activity, the annual "OMBAC World Championship Over The Line Tournament", organized by Old Mission Beach Athletic Club, is a prominent event in San Diego's beach sports life. The tournament has a history of adult-themed team names, often with variations of the sport's equipment — namely bats and balls — that are seen as explicit enough to discourage most youth attendance. As such, the tournament has gained a negative reputation over the years for these hedonistic and sexual overtones. Despite its infamous reputation, however, the game has grown in popularity among the San Diego populace and governing bodies over the years, even surpassing about 60,000 spectators during the two July weekends the annual tournament was hosted in 2011. To help highlight the sport rather than the spectacle and encourage more family-friendly participation, OMBAC has made strides to cut back on these and some of the tournament's other, more offensive, elements by discouraging slogans such as "beer, babes, and bats on the beach".

The annual World Championships now gathers more than 1,200 teams from all over the world separated into multiple divisions. Players range in age from 18 to 80 years old and are split by gender. In an effort to help further the sport, an OTL Players Association was established several years ago. They currently host several additional tournaments each year.
