= First baseman =

Infield defensive position in baseball and softball

The position of the first baseman.

A first baseman, abbreviated 1B, is the player on a baseball or softball team who plays near first base, the first of four bases a baserunner must touch in succession to score a run. The first baseman is responsible for fielding ground ball hits in their area and receiving throws from other fielders to record outs at first base. In the numbering system used to record defensive plays, the first baseman is assigned the number 3.

Also known as a first sacker or cornerman, the first baseman typically needs good flexibility, coordination, and quick reflexes. Much of the position involved receiving throws from other infielders, the catcher, and the pitcher. The first baseman must be able to stretch toward inaccurate throws while maintaining contact with the base, allowing them to catch the ball before the batter-runner reaches first.

== Fielding ==
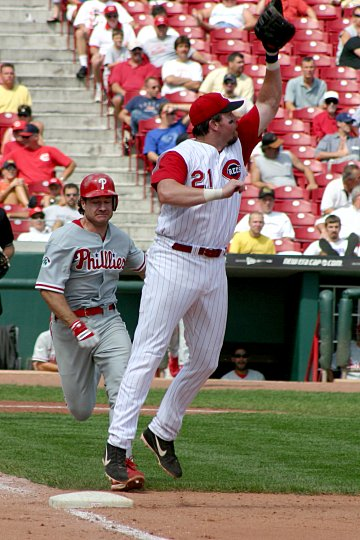
Sean Casey, former first baseman for the Cincinnati Reds tries unsuccessfully to keep his foot on the base while receiving a throw from an infielder.

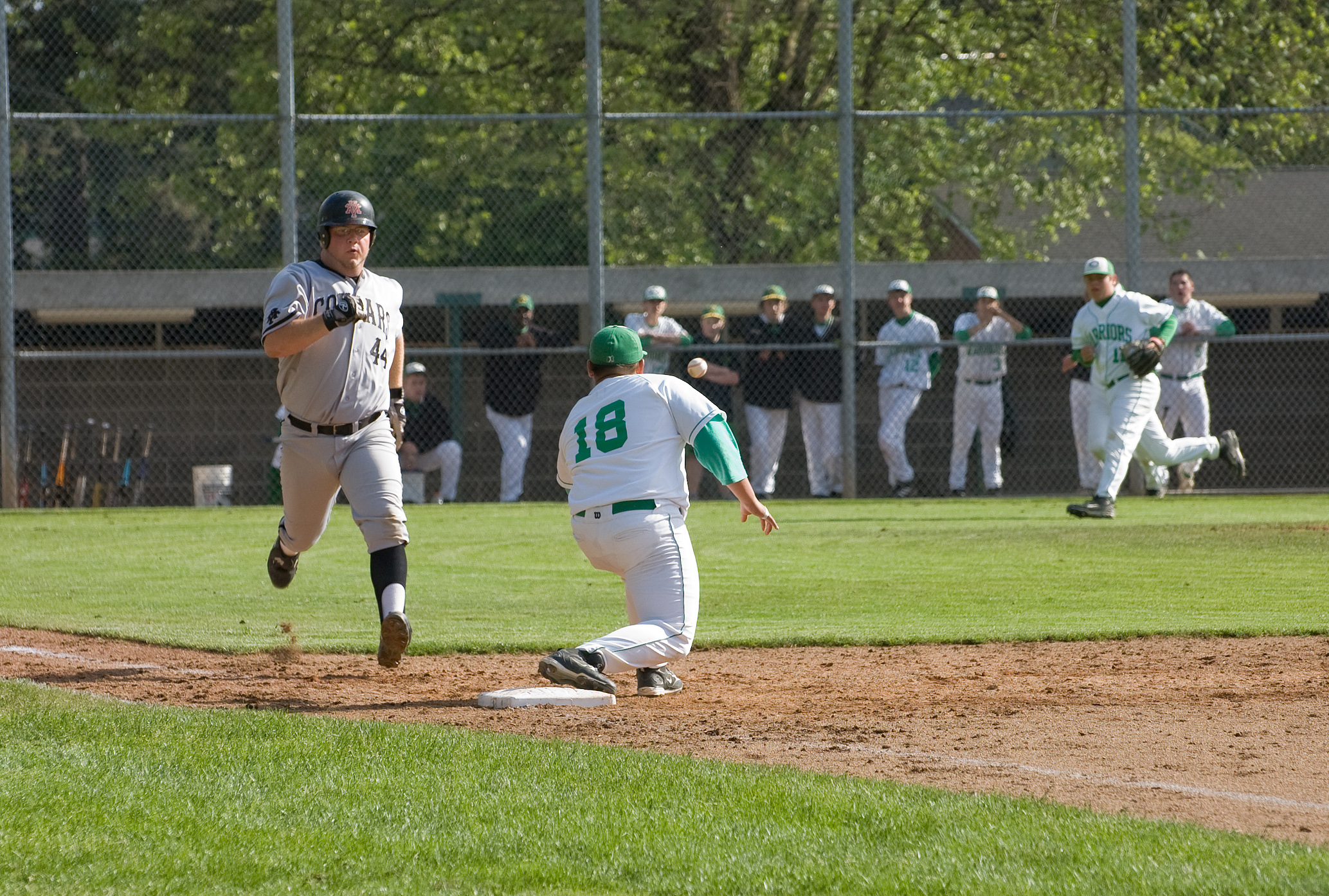
A high school first baseman takes a throw from the third baseman in an attempt to have the runner called "out".

One of the first baseman's primary responsibilities is receiving throws from other infielders to retire the batter-runner at first base. The first baseman must also field ground balls hit in their direction. On some plays, the first baseman fields a ground ball and throws to another fielder or, when necessary, relies on the pitcher to cover first base and receive the throw.

=== In general ===
The first baseman often stays close to the base to hold baserunners or reach the bag in time to receive a throw. Compared with other infielders, first basemen generally have less responsibility for covering a large area of the field.

Players sometimes move to first base later in their careers as their speed, throwing ability, or defensive range declines. Teams may also move players to first base to accommodate another player at their original position or to reduce the physical demands of a position such as catcher.

=== Position ===
Unlike the pitcher and catcher, who must begin each play in designated areas, the first baseman and other fielders can adjust their positions based on the batter, baserunners, and expected play.

When no baserunner occupies first base, the first baseman usually positions themself behind the base and near the foul line. Their exact position depends on the batter's hitting tendencies and the game situation. Against a right-handed pull hitter, the first baseman may move closer to the second baseman's usual position. Against a left-handed pull hitter, they may position themself closer to the foul line to defend against a round ball hit down the line.

To defend against a bunt, the first baseman may move closer to home plate as the pitch is delivered. If the batter attempts to bunt, the first baseman charges toward the ball while the second baseman covers first base.

With a base runner present at first base, the first baseman stands with their right foot touching the base to prepare for a pickoff attempt. Once the pitcher commits to throwing towards home plate, the first baseman comes off the bag in front of the runner and gets in a fielding position. If the bases are loaded, or if the runner on first base is not a base stealing threat, the first baseman will position himself behind the runner and appropriate for the current batter.

When waiting for a throw from another player, the first baseman stands with their off-glove foot touching the base, then stretches toward the throw. This stretch decreases the amount of time it takes the throw to get to first and encourages the umpire to call close plays in favor of the fielding team. Veteran first basemen are known to pull off the bag early on close plays to convince the umpire that the ball reached their glove before the runner reached first base. The first baseman also has the responsibility of cutting off throws from any of the three outfield positions on their way to home plate. Though highly situational, the first baseman usually only receives throws from the center or right fielder.

=== Double play ===
The first baseman is usually at the end of a double play, though he can be at the beginning and end of a double play. Unusual double plays involving the first baseman include the 3–6–3, 3–4–3, 3–2–3, or a 3–6–1 double play. In a 3–6–3 or 3–4–3 double play, the first baseman fields the ball, throws to second, where the shortstop (6) or second baseman (4) catches the ball to make the first out and then throws back to the first baseman who reaches first base in time to tag first base before the batter reaches first base. For a 3–2–3 double play, the bases must be loaded for the force-out at home plate or the catcher must tag the runner coming from third base out. With a force-out at home plate, the first baseman fields the ball, throws to the catcher, the catcher steps on home plate for the first out, then he throws it back to the first baseman to complete the double play. The 3–2–3 double play with a tag out at home plate is usually not attempted because of the possibility of the catcher not being able to tag the runner and/or block the plate. If the runner at third base is known as a good or fast baserunner, the first basemen will make considerable effort to make sure the third base runner does not advance to home plate for a run by "looking" him back to third base. The primary goal of the first baseman in this instance is to ensure the runner does not advance and that the team records at least one out, especially in a close game. A 3–6–1 double play is almost like a 3–6–3 or a 3–4–3 double play, but the first baseman is usually playing deep in the infield. Here, the first baseman throws the ball to the shortstop covering second, but the pitcher then has the responsibility of covering first base to receive the throw from the shortstop.

A first baseman can theoretically also make an unassisted double play. There are two ways to achieve this. The first is by catching a line drive and returning to first base to tag the base before a baserunner can return. This is rare because the first baseman is usually slower than most baserunners who generally return to their bases on line drives near any fielder. The second is by getting an infield hit to the right when there is a runner on first, tagging the runner and returning to the first base in time to get the man running towards him.

== Left-handed throwing first basemen ==
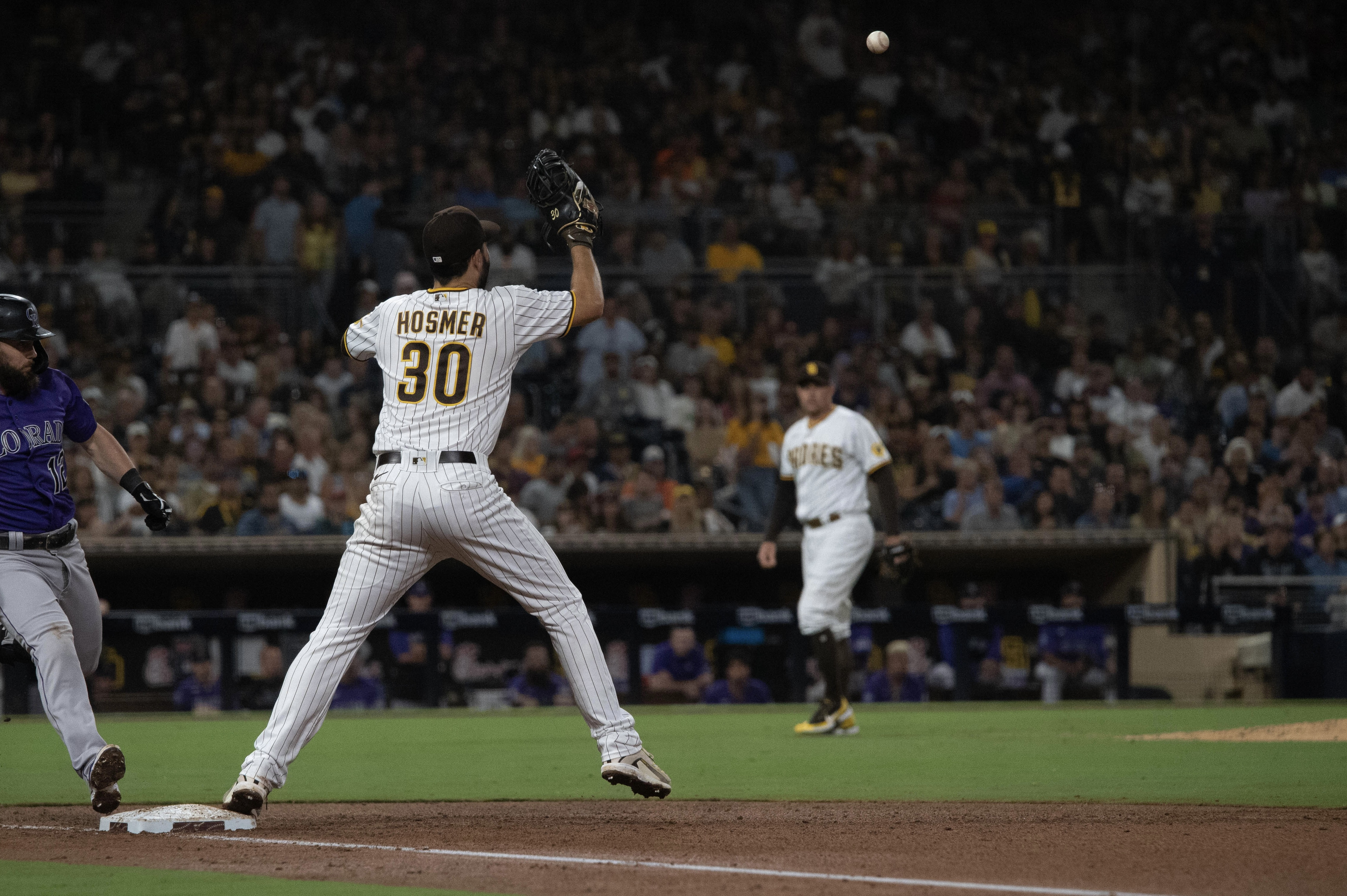
Eric Hosmer of the San Diego Padres, an example of a left-handed throwing first baseman.

A left-handed throwing non-pitcher is often converted to or begins their career playing at first base. A left-handed throwing baseball player who is not particularly fast or has a weak arm (and therefore not well suited for playing in the outfield) will usually be relegated to playing first base. This is because the only other positions available to the player (catcher, third base, shortstop or second base) are overwhelmingly held by right-handed throwing players, who can make quicker throws to first base (or, in the case of catchers, third base).

The same advantages of being a right-handed throwing catcher, third basemen, shortstop or second basemen apply to the left-handed first baseman. These advantages surface in plays where the player is required to throw to another infielder after fielding a batted ball. In these instances, a right-hander will be required to turn more towards their target before throwing whereas a left-hander will usually already be positioned to make a throw. However, compared to the advantage for the right-handed throwing third baseman, shortstop, or second baseman, these advantages for the left-handed first baseman are minor because many balls hit to the first baseman are to their right, so that a right-handed first baseman fielding them backhanded does not need to turn after fielding a batted ball to throw it. In addition, a majority of plays only require the first baseman to receive a throw, not to field or throw himself. This is attributed to the overall majority of baseball players batting right-handed, and therefore, a majority of batted balls are hit to the left side of the infield and fielded by the third baseman or shortstop. Left-handed first basemen are also advantageous in attempting to pick off baserunners at first, as the left-hander can catch and tag in one motion, often doing both at the same time, while right-handed first baseman must sweep their glove across their body, costing them a crucial fraction of a second in applying the tag.

== First-baseman's mitt ==
The first baseman's mitt is similar to a catcher's mitt in that it has extra padding and has no individual fingers. Only catchers and first basemen are allowed to wear a mitt, while all other players must wear a glove. It is much larger than the other infielders' gloves; it is wide, very deep, and it is crescent-shaped at its edges, allowing the first-baseman to use the mitt like a scoop in catching errant throws from other players on the infield.

Since many throws to first base are made in great haste, the first baseman must be prepared to catch balls that are either high or low, as well as balls thrown quite a distance to either side, all while maintaining contact with the base (using one foot or the other). This requires a fair amount of agility and physical coordination. Among the most difficult plays a first baseman is normally required to make are the "short hop" and the "tag play", both of which are far easier to execute when the fielder is wearing the first-baseman's mitt rather than another type of glove.

=== Short hop ===
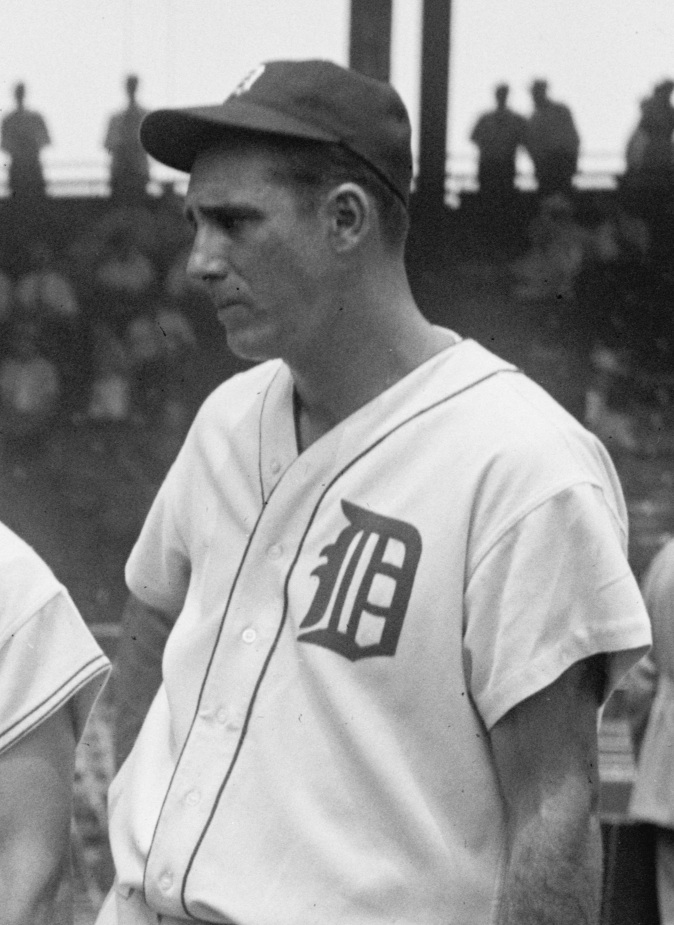
Hank Greenberg, Hall of Fame first baseman and 2-time MVP

A short hop is a ball that bounces immediately in front of an infielder. If the batter is a fast runner an infielder may intentionally short hop the ball to quicken his throw to first base. A short hop can be used to turn a double play. Every ground ball hit to an infielder becomes a race between the batter-runner and the team in the field; the fielder must catch the batted ball and throw it to first before the batter can reach the base. Consequently, part of the first baseman's job is to step toward the incoming ball and stretch their body so that their catching hand makes contact with it as soon as physically possible. Compared to catching the ball while standing passively on the base, this shaves a fraction of a second from the time the runner has to reach base. When it is thrown too low and bounces before reaching the first baseman, catching the ball is difficult, especially while he is in a "stretch position". A throw caught shortly after its bounce, that is, while the baseball's path, rebounding from the turf, is sharply upward, is called a "short hop". Since a ball that strikes the ground is always subject to the possibility of encountering a pebble or a rut or a spike-mark that sends it in a radically new direction, it is best that the first baseman catch the ball on the short hop by swiping or scooping the ball as close to the ground surface as possible. This technique also minimizes the amount of time required to make the putout.

=== Tag play ===
The second-most-difficult play for a first baseman is the "tag play". Whenever an infielder's throw is so far off the mark that the first baseman must abandon their base to catch it, the first baseman is left with only two options. To put the runner out, he must either lunge back to the base before the runner reaches it, or he must tag the runner before the runner reaches the base. A tag involves touching the runner with the ball (or with the gloved hand holding the ball) before the runner reaches the base. At first base, the typical tag play occurs when the infielder's throw is high and to the left of the first baseman, causing him to jump and stretch their long mitt to catch the ball before it sails into the dugout or the grandstand. The tag is made, after the catch, by swiping the mitt downward, toward the in-coming runner's head or shoulder, often in one fluid motion that is integrated with the act of catching the ball. Performed properly, the tag play can be spectacular to see.

== As a career move ==
First basemen are generally not regarded as the most defensively skilled players on a Major League team. Someone who has the agility, throwing arm, and raw speed to play another fielding position usually plays somewhere other than first base. Additionally, strong-hitting catchers may be put at first base in some games, allowing them to remain in the lineup while reducing the physical demands associated with catching regularly. In amateur baseball, left-handed players are frequently assigned to first base, as their throwing orientation limits their suitability for other infield positions, and it also has fewer demands on range and arm strength than other fielding positions like outfield.

According to Bill James, aside from pitchers and catchers, the most difficult defensive position to play is shortstop, followed by second base, center field, third base, left or right field (depending upon the ballpark), and finally first base as the easiest position. Anyone who can play another position on the field can play first base.

Lou Gehrig is an example of a player who played first base because he was not as strong a fielder as hitter. At or near the ends of their careers, good hitters are often moved to first base as their speed and throwing arms deteriorate, a more talented position player was acquired, or their teams become concerned with the likelihood of injury. Such players include Hall of Famers George Brett, Paul Molitor, Mike Schmidt and Jim Thome (third basemen), Ernie Banks (shortstop), Rod Carew (second baseman), Al Kaline (right fielder), Mickey Mantle (center fielder), Johnny Bench, Joe Mauer, and Mike Piazza (catchers), Stan Musial and Willie Stargell (left fielders). In 2023, Philadelphia Phillies all-star Bryce Harper moved from outfield to first base after undergoing Tommy John surgery; this enabled Harper to return to the field quicker than expected while also lessening the stress of throwing with his surgically repaired right arm. Only rarely does a player begin his major-league career at first base and go elsewhere, as with Jackie Robinson, a natural second baseman who was played at first base in his rookie season so that he would avoid the risk of malicious slides at second base. Hank Greenberg, a natural first baseman for the Detroit Tigers, moved to left field in his 11th major league season (1940) after his team acquired Rudy York, another slugging first baseman who was ill-suited to play anywhere else.

== Hall of Famers ==
- Dick Allen
- Cap Anson
- Jeff Bagwell
- Jake Beckley
- Jim Bottomley
- Dan Brouthers
- Orlando Cepeda
- Frank Chance
- Roger Connor
- Jimmie Foxx
- Lou Gehrig
- Hank Greenberg
- Todd Helton
- Gil Hodges
- George Kelly
- Harmon Killebrew
- Buck Leonard
- Willie McCovey
- Fred McGriff
- Johnny Mize
- Eddie Murray
- Tony Pérez
- George Sisler
- Mule Suttles
- Ben Taylor
- Bill Terry
- Frank Thomas
- Jim Thome
