= Lead off =

Baseball term for baserunner positioning

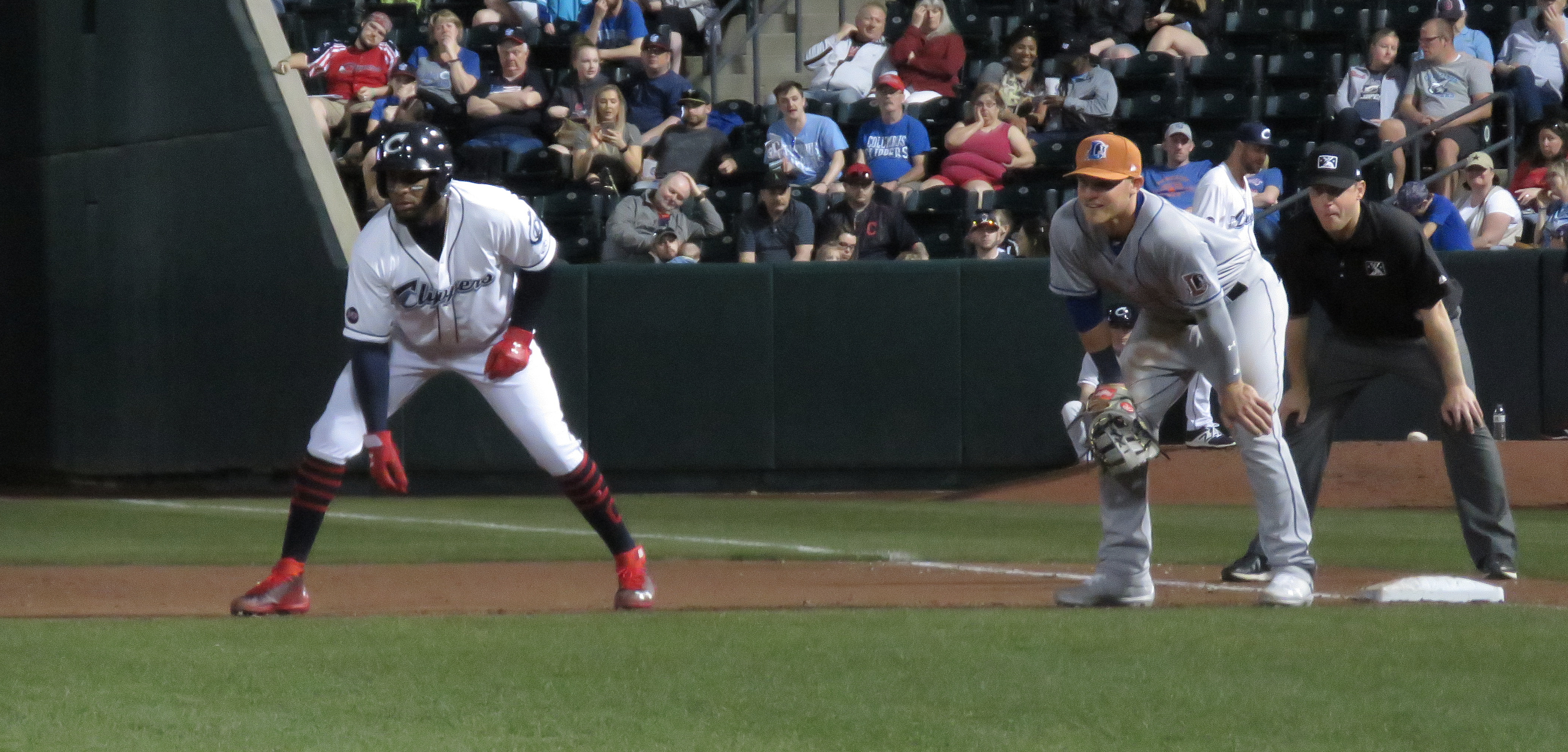
Yandy Díaz of the Columbus Clippers takes a lead off of first base during a 2018 game against the Durham Bulls

In baseball and softball, a lead or lead off is the short distance that a player stands away from their current base.

== On the bases ==
In baseball, to lead off, or to take a lead, refers to the position a baserunner takes just prior to a pitch, a short distance away from the base the player occupies. A "lead" can also refer to that distance. A typical lead is six to ten feet (two to three meters) from the base. If the lead is too large, the runner risks being picked off. If the lead is too small, the runner has a disadvantage in reaching the next base, whether in a stolen base attempt or in connection with the next batted ball.

While in baseball a baserunner can lead off before a pitch is thrown, in most codes of softball, baserunners are not allowed to leave a base until the ball is released from the pitcher's hand.

== See also ==
- "Backing up", the cricket equivalent
