= Dugout (baseball) =

Staging area for a baseball team

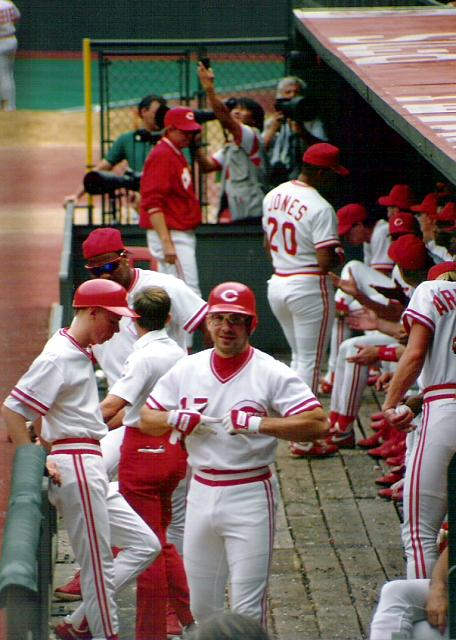
Cincinnati Reds' dugout, 1991

In baseball, the dugout is a team's bench and is located in foul territory between home plate and either first or third base. There are two dugouts, one for the home team and one for the visiting team. In general, the dugout is occupied by all players not prescribed to be on the field at that particular time, as well as coaches and other personnel authorized by the league. The players' equipment (gloves, bats, batting helmets, catcher's equipment, etc.) is usually stored in the dugout.

In baseball, the manager, with the help of his assistants, will dictate offensive strategy from the dugout by sending hand signals to the first and third base coaches. To avoid detection, the first and third base coaches will then translate those hand signals into their own set of hand signals and then send them on to the batter and runners.

== Origin ==
The term dugout refers to the area being slightly depressed below field level, as is common in professional baseball. The prevailing theory of the origin of locating the dugouts below field level is that it allowed spectators seated behind the dugouts to see the field, specifically the home plate area. Unlike most other sports, the primary action in baseball is centered on one area – home plate – and obstructing this area from fans' view, even if by players on the bench, would not be popular with fans.

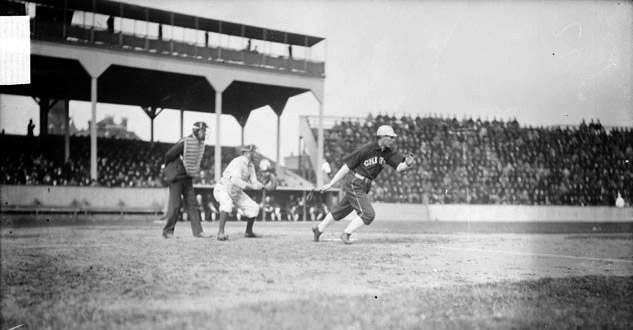
Action in 1905 at West Side Park, Chicago. Ground-level bench in background.

Not all dugouts are located below the field level. At the major league level, the few dugouts that are located at the field level are in multi-purpose stadiums to simplify the conversion from baseball configuration to another sports field configuration. At such ballparks, the seating area is raised such that the dugouts do not obstruct the spectators' view. Dugouts are also at field level at most amateur ballparks, where locating them below field level would be cost prohibitive or otherwise not beneficial. In these cases, the term "dugout" still applies, as does "bench." In the early days of professional baseball, the seating areas were often constructed high enough that the bench was at field level.

== Variations ==
Most professional and collegiate ballparks feature dugouts that are below the field level, with concrete steps along the entire length of the dugout. Some feature a railing along the top step, or "lip", while others are open.

In most Major League Baseball ballparks, as well as many minor league ballparks, the dugout is directly connected to the clubhouse by a tunnel.

Most high school, Little League, and recreational ballparks feature dugouts that are at the field level, usually separated from the playing field by chain-link fencing.

Cardines Field in Newport, Rhode Island, home of the Newport Gulls, features both dugouts on the first base side.

== Official rules ==
MLB rule 3.17 specifies that "no one except players, substitutes, managers, coaches, athletic trainers and batboys shall occupy a bench during a game." The rule also stipulates that players on the injured list are allowed in the dugout, but may not enter the field of play at any time during the game. Players and coaches who have been ejected from the game may not remain in the dugout per Rule 4.07.

Unlike most other sports, where a ball or puck entering a team's bench area has already passed out of bounds and is thus dead before it reaches the bench, it is possible in baseball for a dugout to be a factor in play. MLB rule 6.05(a) states that a fielder may reach into a dugout to catch a fly ball as long as one or both feet is on or over the playing field, and does not have a foot on the ground in the dugout when making the catch. MLB universal ground rules state that the player may subsequently enter the dugout after making the catch if his momentum is carrying him that way, but if he falls in the dugout as a result, the catch is allowed but baserunners advance in accordance with Rule 7.04(c).

A live ball entering a dugout becomes dead and the batter-runner and any base runners advance in accordance with Rule 7.04(c). However, a live ball bouncing off a dugout railing, if present, is still in play (unless a foul ball). Due to the dugouts' location in foul territory, live balls entering dugouts usually only occur after an errant throw by the defensive team.

== Dugout choice in MLB ==
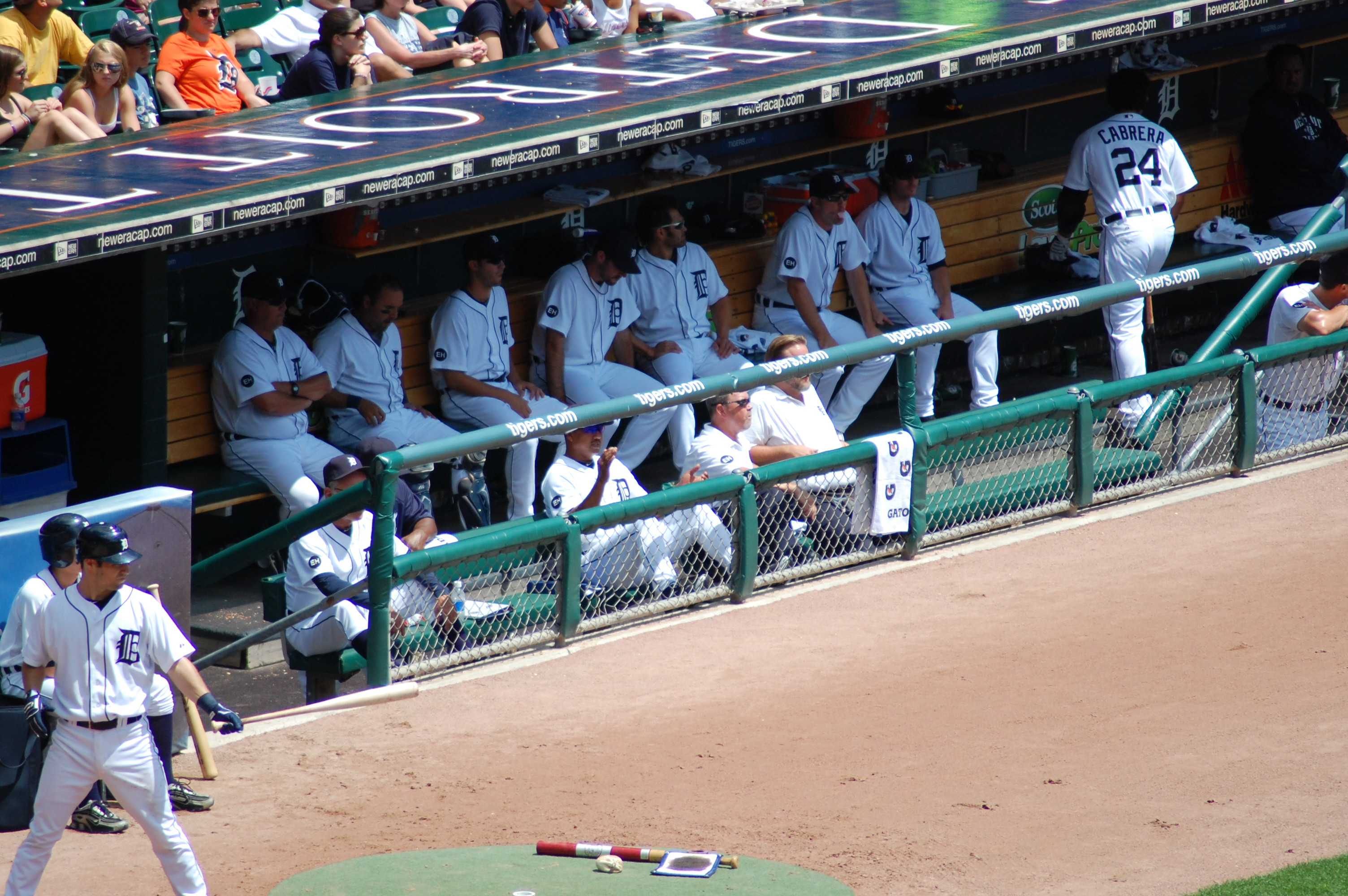
The dugout of the Detroit Tigers in Comerica Park is located on the third base side.

Which team occupies the dugout on the first-base side or the third-base side is purely arbitrary. The Major League Baseball Rulebook is silent on the subject. In the past, the manager also served as the third base coach, so occupying the third base dugout meant less walking for the manager between innings. Contrarily, the thought is that since more close plays occur at first base than third, the first base dugout is preferred. For a pre-existing facility, the home team might choose the better clubhouse and the dugout on that side of the field. (For example, prior to their 2008 move to Nationals Park, the Washington Nationals occupied the third-base dugout at RFK Stadium because it was the larger and newer of the two dugouts.) Another factor can be the sun angle during day games. In ballparks where one of the dugouts faces direct sunlight for much of the game, which can be problematic on hot summer days, the home club might choose the dugout that is better shaded.

In both the National League and American League, more home team dugouts are on the first-base side (9 to 6 each). Even the two oldest parks still in use differ on this point: the Cubs sit on the third-base side at Wrigley while the Red Sox inhabit the first-base dugout at Fenway. Due to the ballpark's orientation, at Wrigley the third-base dugout faces away from the sun from noon onward, whereas the first base dugout faces sunlight in the late innings. At Fenway, the third-base dugout faces the sun for part of a day game, while the first-base dugout remains shaded.

=== First base side ===
- Atlanta Braves (Truist Park)
- Baltimore Orioles (Oriole Park at Camden Yards)
- Boston Red Sox (Fenway Park)
- Cincinnati Reds (Great American Ball Park)
- Colorado Rockies (Coors Field)
- Houston Astros (Daikin Park)
- Kansas City Royals (Kauffman Stadium)
- Milwaukee Brewers (American Family Field)
- Minnesota Twins (Target Field)
- New York Mets (Citi Field)
- New York Yankees (Yankee Stadium)
- Philadelphia Phillies (Citizens Bank Park)
- Seattle Mariners (T-Mobile Park)
- St. Louis Cardinals (Busch Stadium)
- San Diego Padres (Petco Park)
- Tampa Bay Rays (Tropicana Field)
- Texas Rangers (Globe Life Field)
- Washington Nationals (Nationals Park)

=== Third base side ===
- Arizona Diamondbacks (Chase Field)
- Chicago Cubs (Wrigley Field)
- Chicago White Sox (Rate Field)
- Cleveland Guardians (Progressive Field)
- Detroit Tigers (Comerica Park)
- Los Angeles Angels (Angel Stadium)
- Los Angeles Dodgers (Dodger Stadium)
- Miami Marlins (LoanDepot Park)
- Athletics (Sutter Health Park)
- Pittsburgh Pirates (PNC Park)
- San Francisco Giants (Oracle Park)
- Toronto Blue Jays (Rogers Centre)

== See also ==
- Bullpen
- Technical area
