= Hotbox (baseball) =

Baseball drill

Hotbox is a baseball drill or mini-game that can be played with three or more players and two to four bases. The variation with only two bases can also be called pickle, rundown, or running bases. In the drill, one fielder plays near each of the bases and the rest of the players are runners, who begin on any base. The fielders proceed to throw the ball to each other, playing catch. At any time, a runner may attempt to run to the next or previous base. The fielders then attempt to throw to each other and tag that runner out. If a runner is tagged out (either once or three times), he then becomes a fielder, and the fielder who tagged him out becomes a runner. Runners count how many bases they reach safely, and the player with the most bases when the group decides to quit, wins. If there are three or more bases, the runners may run in either direction.

Runners will often get into a rundown or "hotbox". The fielders must use teamwork and skill to put the runners out. Errors usually happen as well, where the fielders must contend as the runners scramble to earn additional bases.

Fielders must take care not to hit the runners with a thrown ball. Some players may choose to devise a penalty for hitting a runner with a ball, such as a deduction in the fielder's own score. Batter's helmets are recommended. If it is too difficult for runners to advance safely, the bases can be spaced closer together to shift the balance; conversely, bases further apart give the fielders an advantage (assuming they can throw well).
