= Pickoff =

Baseball defensive play

In baseball, a pickoff is an act by a pitcher or catcher, throwing a live ball to a fielder so that the fielder can tag out a baserunner who is either leading off or about to begin stealing the next base.

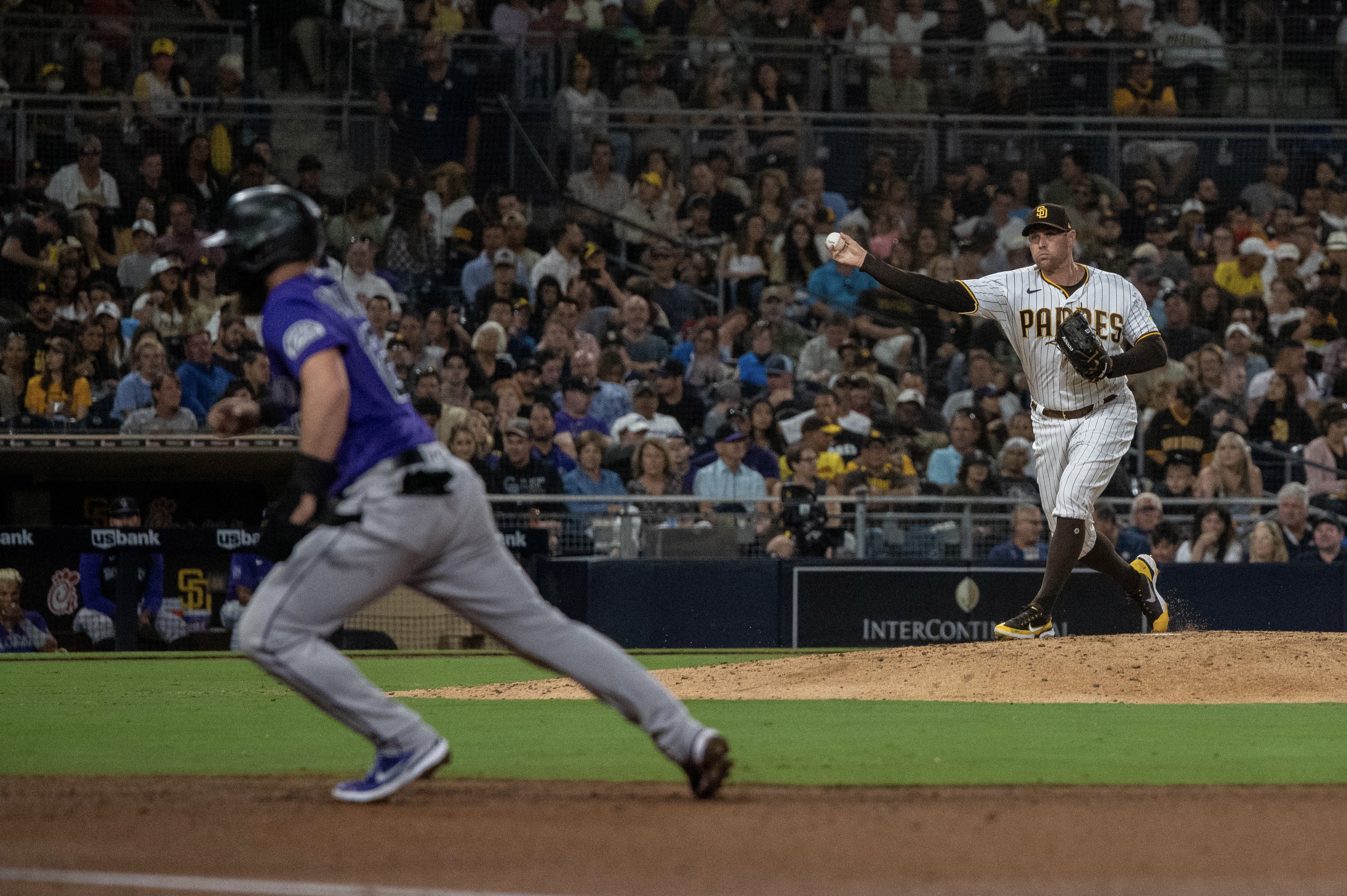
San Diego Padres pitcher Craig Stammen attempts to pickoff a baserunner

A pickoff attempt occurs when this throw is made in an attempt to make such an out or, more commonly, to "keep the runner close" by making it clear that the pitcher is aware and concerned with the runner's actions. A catcher may also attempt to throw runners out who likewise "stray too far" from their bases after a pitch; this can also be called a pickoff attempt. A runner who is picked off is said to have been caught napping, especially if he made no attempt to return to his base. A pickoff move is the motion the pitcher goes through in making this attempt; some pitchers have better pickoff moves than others.

Pitchers in professional baseball use the pickoff move often, perhaps several times per game or even per inning if speedy baserunners reach base. Pitchers with more confidence in their ability to eliminate batters directly via strikeouts or flyouts use fewer pickoff attempts. In lower-skilled amateur games, the pickoff move is less common due to the potential for an error if the pitcher throws wild or the fielder fails to make the catch. In youth leagues that do not allow leading off, such as Little League and the Babe Ruth League, the need for a pickoff move is eliminated. A pickoff may result in a rundown.

== Technique ==
A pitcher uses many tactics to attempt to disguise whether he is going to begin a pitch or a pickoff attempt. However, some deceptive actions are illegal and may be called a balk.

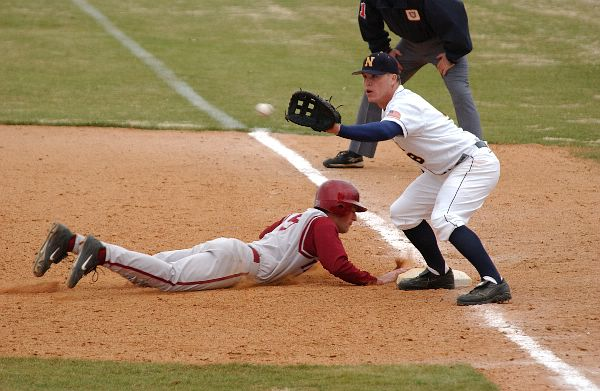
Pickoff attempt on runner (in red) at first base

When there is a baserunner, the pitcher will pitch from the stretch, one of the pitching positions. The following scenario is when a runner is at first base.

From the set position, a right-handed pitcher can still see the baserunner out of the corner of his eye. A left-handed pitcher has a clear view of the baserunner because of his position on the pitcher's mound. If it is a right-handed pitcher there is only one main method of this pickoff move. This involves a quick shuffle of the pitcher's feet to turn towards first base and throw the ball to the first baseman. The first baseman will then attempt to tag out the runner. The left-handed pitcher, due to their natural stance and the way they are facing, has multiple moves. The two main methods are called the "snap throw" and "spin move". The snap throw is when the pitcher quickly lifts his back foot behind the pitching rubber and slings the ball to the first baseman. A snap throw can also refer to the catcher throwing the ball to the base following a pitch. The spin move is when the pitcher lifts his leg like he is going to pitch the ball but then rotates his body toward first and throws the ball. The pitcher will try to vary this move by doing this move while looking at the runner or at the batter, which can be deceiving to the baserunner. A former pickoff move in Major League Baseball used mostly by right-handed pitchers was called "third to first" and could only be done if there were baserunners on first and third. It was performed by the pitcher faking a pickoff at third, then stopping, spinning and throwing the ball to first base instead. This move was used to try to get the base-runner or the batter to disclose what action they were going to perform on the pitch. Former Kansas City Royals right-hander, Steve Busby, is credited for popularizing the "third to first" move, and Jeff Nelson was also known for using it. After the 2012 season, Major League Baseball instituted a rule change defining this move as a balk.

== Purpose ==
There are a few reasons to use this tactic:

- To tag out the base-runner. Sometimes the runner will run on the first move of the pitcher. If the pitcher successfully throws the ball to the base before the base-runner is able to return to it, then the defense will be able to tag out the runner.
- To prevent a stolen base. If a fast base-runner is leading off the base by a large margin, the pitcher will throw over to the base a few times to try to get the base runner to shorten his lead, thus deterring him from stealing. After enough throws the runner will often either shorten his lead or tire from diving back, preventing him from stealing a base.
  - The runner will often take a few steps off the base in order to have a head start toward the next base. The runner will generally not go too far away from the base so if the pitcher does throw, he can return safely. But the pitcher will hope to catch the runner off-guard.
- To extract information from the offense. For example, if the defense suspects a bunting situation, the pitcher may throw over to first in hopes that the batter will square around to bunt on the pitcher's first move, revealing his intention.
- To buy time for a relief pitcher to be prepared to come into the game. This is seen quite often in the major leagues, as the pitcher in the game picks multiple times in a row in an effort to waste time so that his replacement can warm up adequately.

== Holding baserunners ==
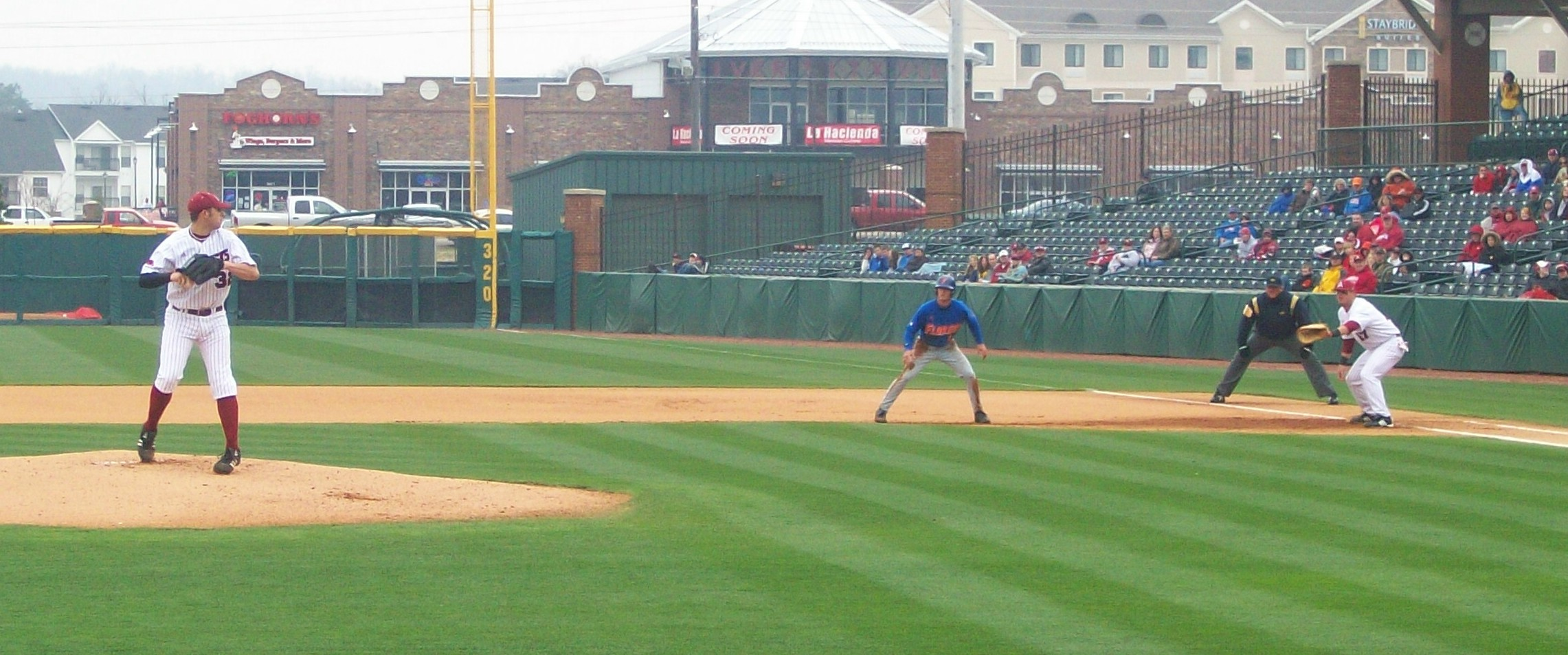
Arkansas’s Mark Bolsinger prepares to throw to first base to try to pick off Florida's Avery Barnes in 2009.

Along with having a good, quick pickoff move, a number of other techniques can be used to help cut down on base-runners getting good jumps at stealing bases. First off, changing look patterns keeps the runner off balance and keeps him from timing out the pitcher and guessing when he can take off. An experienced pitcher learns how to mix up his looks and never allow himself to get into a predictable pattern. The most common occurrence of a pitcher falling into a pattern occurs with a runner on second base. It is very easy for a pitcher to repeatedly look just once at the runner and then start the pitching motion as the head turns to pick up home plate again. This makes base-runners have a very easy time at getting a good start at stealing third base. A second method to cut down on giving up stolen bases is to have a quick delivery to the plate. This can be done with a slide step quite easily, however this is not necessary. A slide step tends to make the pitcher not get as much momentum going to the plate, therefore causing the pitch to lose velocity. To counteract this, a pitcher can do a quick leg kick to get momentum going while not taking a long time. The technique to do this is to lift the leg with the knee going up in an inward motion towards the push leg. The entire pitching motion from the first movement until the ball hits the catcher's glove should take around 1.3–1.5 seconds. By keeping the time under 1.3 seconds, very few runners should be able to steal on even an average-armed catcher. The most important rule to remember while pitching with base-runners on is to stay relaxed. Being tense makes a pitcher much more prone to committing a balk.

A baserunner with a reputation for stealing bases, can also take advantage of the pitcher's desire to hold them to their base, as a means to throw off the pitcher's concentration. By taking a large lead, the runner can hope to force the pitcher to make mistakes, therefore helping the batter, by improving their chances at the plate. Prolific base stealers can accomplish this without a true intention to steal any base at all. Pitchers should be aware of this, and take care not to attempt to pick-off a runner, to the point of fatigue or losing focus on the batter.

== Notable examples ==
On July 11, 1964, Hal Stowe of the Charlotte Hornets was brought in to pitch in a tied game, with two outs and one runner on base. His first move was a successful pickoff throw, ending the inning. The Hornets scored the go-ahead run in their half of the inning, thus giving Stowe credit as the winning pitcher, despite not throwing a single pitch.

On August 24, 1983, Tippy Martinez of the Baltimore Orioles picked off three consecutive Toronto Blue Jays base runners in the first half of the 10th inning. The catcher for the Orioles, utility infielder Lenn Sakata, had replaced the backup catcher at the start of the inning. Sakata had not played as a catcher since Little League, and the Blue Jays thought it would be easy to steal off him. In the bottom half of the same inning, Sakata hit a walk-off home run.

On September 30, 1992, George Brett of the Kansas City Royals was picked off after getting his 3,000th hit.

Game 4 of the 2013 World Series ended with a pickoff, as Koji Uehara of the Boston Red Sox threw to first base, causing St. Louis Cardinals' runner Kolten Wong to be tagged out.

== Records ==
Pickoff records are imprecise, as it is not an official MLB statistic, and historical box scores typically did not distinguish between a pickoff and a caught stealing.

=== Baseball Reference ===
Records per Baseball Reference

- Career: 146 by Steve Carlton
- Single season: 23 by Jerry Garvin of the 1977 Toronto Blue Jays
- Single game: 4, shared by Garvin of the 1977 Toronto Blue Jays (May 25, 1977, vs. Oakland Athletics) and Bill Wight of the 1956 Baltimore Orioles (July 3, 1956; vs. New York Yankees)

=== MLB ===
Records per MLB.com

- Career: 95 by Mark Buehrle
- Single season: 15 by Greg Smith of the 2008 Oakland Athletics

Note that each of the pitchers listed in this section is left-handed.

== See also ==
- Caught stealing
- Stolen base
- Mankading, the cricket equivalent
