= Gurrufío =

Traditional toy

Gurrufío is the Venezuelan term for a button whirligig or buzzer, a simply constructed traditional children’s toy. It consists of a central disk of wood, plastic or metal (even occasionally a soft drink bottle cap that has been hammered flat), with holes drilled or nailed equidistant and close to the center. A piece of string is inserted through both holes, leaving a length of about 15 to 30 centimeters on each side, and the loop is closed with a knot.

== How to play ==
Take the ends of the loop at both sides with the fingers, rotate the disk a bit, and draw the rope taut, fast, and release the tension a bit. The disk will then spin in one direction, reach its maximum, and, helped by another yank, start spinning in the opposite direction.
