= Base running =

Tactical act in baseball

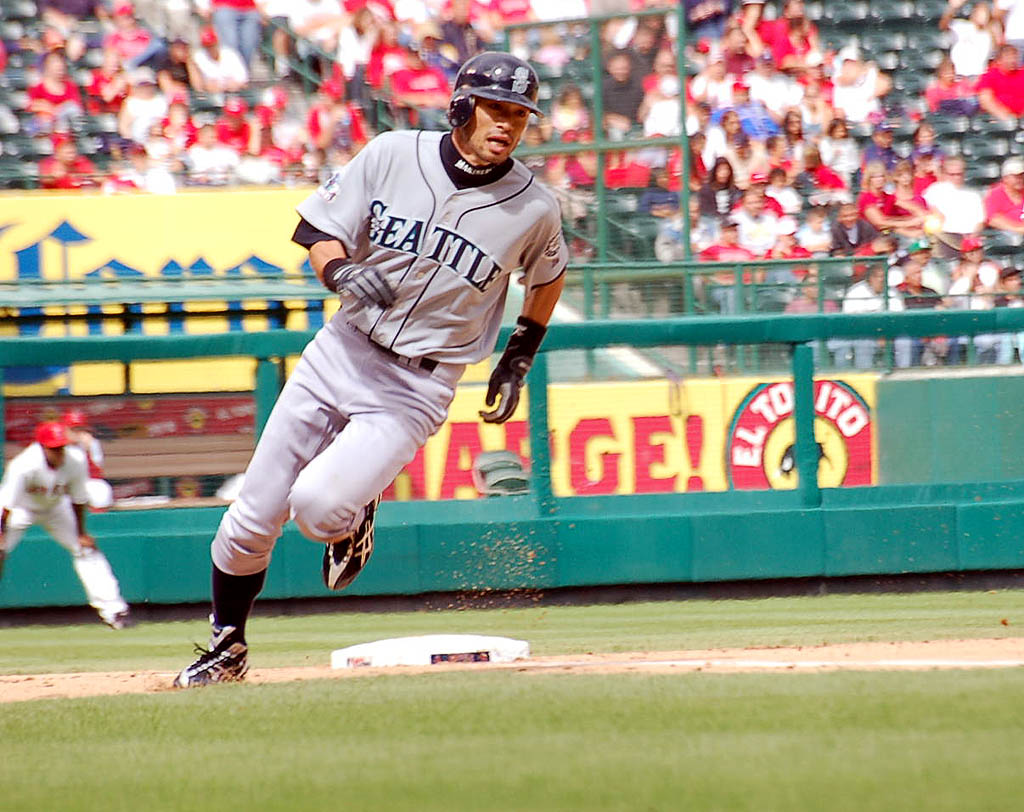
Ichiro Suzuki rounds third base to run towards home plate

In baseball, base running is the act of running from base to base, performed by members of the team at bat.

Base running is a tactical part of the game with the goal of eventually reaching home base (home plate) to score a run. Batters strive to become base runners, and to enable existing base runners to move to a subsequent base or to score. In statistics, the number of baserunners (for example those allowed by a pitcher) is denoted by the abbreviation BR.

== Becoming a runner ==
A batter becomes a base runner when one of the following happens:

- He hits the baseball into fair territory and is not put out,
- He hits into a fielder's choice,
- The defensive team commits an error that allows him to reach base,
- There is an uncaught third strike,
- He receives a base on balls,
- He is hit by a pitch, or
- A fielder (typically, the catcher) interferes with him.

=== The batter-runner ===
The Official Baseball Rules uses the term batter-runner to identify the batter from the time he becomes a base runner until the end of the same play, whether he is successful at legally attaining first base or any subsequent base. The term is not applied if the batter is awarded first base (the last three items in the above list).

=== Ceasing to be a runner ===
A player ceases to be a base runner when:

- He scores a run,
- He is put out in any way,
- He is replaced by a pinch runner,
- A teammate is put out for the third out of the inning.

If a base runner's teammate is put out for the third out of the inning, the base runner is said to be left on base (LOB).

== Running the bases ==
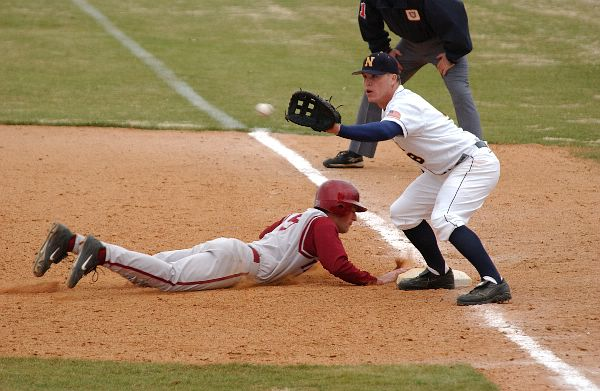
Pick-off attempt on runner (in red) at first base

A runner who is touching a base which he is entitled to occupy may not be tagged out. Runners may attempt to advance from base to base on any fair ball that touches the ground. When a ball is hit in the air (i.e., a fly ball) and caught by the defending team, runners must return and touch the base they occupy—called tagging up—after the ball is first touched by a fielder. Once they do this, they may attempt to advance at their own risk. On a ball that touches the ground in fair territory, if there is a force, runners are required to run.

Base runners may attempt to advance at any time while the ball is alive, even before or while the pitcher is throwing a pitch. The catcher—or pitcher, in lieu of delivering the pitch—often tries to prevent this by throwing the ball to one of the infielders in order to tag the runner. This pick-off attempt is usually unsuccessful in tagging out the runner but is effective in keeping the runner closer to the base. If the runner is tagged out while diving back to the base, it is called a pickoff. If the runner attempts to advance to the next base but is tagged out before reaching it safely, he is caught stealing. A successful attempt by the runner is called a stolen base. If a pitch gets away from the catcher, runners may also try to advance. This may be a wild pitch, if the pitcher is held responsible for the ball getting away, or a passed ball if the catcher is deemed to be at fault. Sometimes the defending team will ignore a runner who is trying to steal a base; in this case a runner is not credited with a steal, and the base is attributed to defensive indifference.

== Strategy ==
An infielder who cleanly fields a ball hit on the ground, then throws it quickly and accurately, will usually get the ball to a base before the runner runs the 90 feet (27 m). However, any hesitation or mistake on the part of the fielder may allow the runner to reach the base safely. Teams scout the opposition and take advantage of players who are poor at defense. For example, on a deep fly ball to center field with a man on second base, if the center fielder has a weak arm, the runner on second base may tag the base and attempt to reach third despite the risks of being tagged out.

Base running and hitting are coordinated to produce better results in the squeeze play and the hit and run play. When the count is full and there are two outs, any runners forced to advance begin running as soon as the pitcher's motion obliges him to complete his pitch, as their distance from the base will not be the cause of any third out. Good runners also try to get extra bases when a play is being made at a different base. For example, a batter who hits a single should determine whether the defense's focus on another runner gives the batter a chance to reach second base.

Sliding into a base is an important part of base running. The pop-up slide both ensures that the runner touches the base and elevates him to an upright posture to help him take additional bases if the defense misperforms. A take-out slide tries to use a collision with a fielder to keep him from taking additional action, such as throwing to achieve a double play. However, this move, when made independently of the attempt to reach the base, has been illegal since 2016 because of the potential for injury. The base coach at third base, and any batter still at home plate, may watch the ball approaching the base and may signal the base runner on the optimum slide to avoid being tagged out.

== Records ==
The most baserunners allowed by a pitcher in a game since 1901 is 39, by Eddie Rommel, who pitched 17 innings in relief for the Philadelphia Athletics to defeat the Cleveland Indians, 18–17, on July 10, 1932. The record number of baserunners in a season is 820, by John Coleman of the Philadelphia Quakers in 1883. Wilbur Wood of the 1973 Chicago White Sox was the last pitcher to allow more than 500 baserunners in a season.

== See also ==
- Scoring position
- Running bases, a baseball drill
- Base running as a metaphor for advancing through stages of physical intimacy
