= Rundown =

Situation in baseball

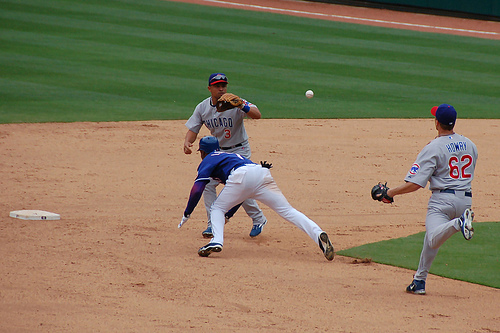
A typical rundown situation in baseball showing a baserunner for the Texas Rangers as he attempts to evade the Chicago Cubs defense.

In baseball, a rundown, informally known as a pickle, the hotbox, or goose chase is a situation that occurs when the baserunner is stranded between two bases, also known as no-man's land, and is in jeopardy of being tagged out. When the baserunner attempts to advance to the next base, he is cut off by the defensive player who has a live ball, and attempts to return to his previous base before being tagged out. As he is doing this, the defender throws the ball past the baserunner to the defender at the previous base, forcing the baserunner to reverse directions again. This is repeated until the runner is put out or reaches a base safely.

A rundown can be escaped if a fielder makes an error, the runner gets around the fielder with the ball without running out of the baseline, a fielder throws the ball elsewhere (e.g., toward home plate if another runner is trying to score), or the runner manages to get by the fielder without the ball while there is no other fielder to cover the runner's destination base.

== Intentional rundown ==
It is possible for a runner on one of the other bases to create an intentional rundown to allow a runner on third to score.

== Drilling ==
Teams and players do practice for this situation in drills in practice or warmups.

== Strategy ==
There are a variety of strategies for how the defense will deal with trying to get a runner out who has been caught in a pickle. Different teams, players, and coaches will follow different strategies.
