= Live ball (baseball) =

Condition in which play can proceed

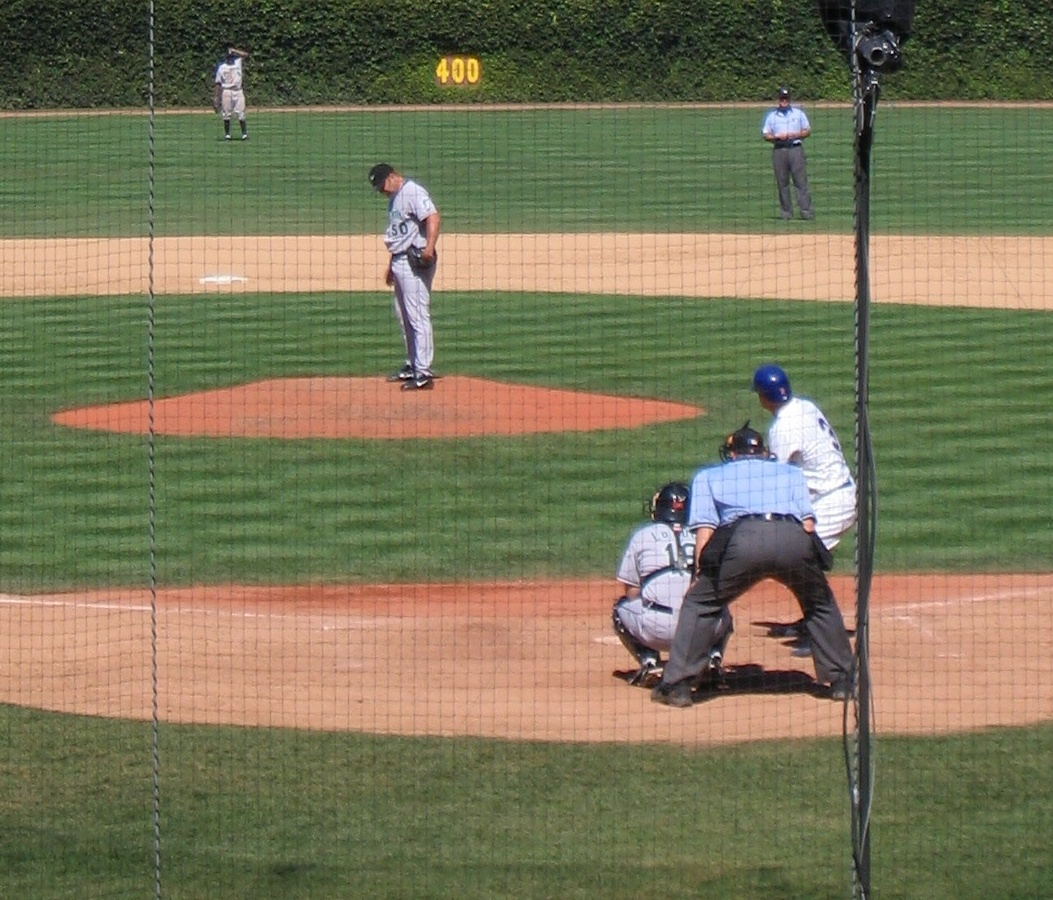
A ball may not become live until the pitcher is on the rubber ready to pitch and the batter, catcher, and umpire are ready--much like in this photo, taken during the August 27, 2005 Cubs-Marlins game.

In baseball, when the ball is alive (or in play), the game can proceed. The pitcher may pitch the ball, the batter may attempt to hit such a pitch, baserunners may attempt to advance at their own risk, and the defense may attempt to put the batter or baserunners out.

== Definition ==
The ball becomes live when the pitcher is on the pitcher's plate ready to pitch; the batter, catcher, and the umpire are all ready; and the umpire calls or signals "Play".

The ball remains alive until it becomes dead by a number of different occurrences. Thus, the ball often remains alive even after playing action ends. Technically, the ball remains alive between half-innings, though no action can occur after the end of a half-inning until the first pitch of the next half-inning.

== Examples ==
Participants must always be alert and attentive when the ball is alive; vigilance can be relaxed when the ball is dead. Thus it is important for players to always know whether the ball is alive. One infamous incident occurred in Game 2 of the 1998 American League Championship Series, which featured the New York Yankees against the Cleveland Indians. With Enrique Wilson on first base and no outs, the Indians' Travis Fryman laid down a bunt that first baseman Tino Martinez fielded inside the line. Martinez's throw to Chuck Knoblauch, covering first base, hit Fryman in the back and caromed 20 feet away.

Instead of chasing down the ball, Knoblauch ignored it to argue with umpire Ted Hendry, claiming interference by Fryman. During the debate, Wilson rounded the bases to score the go-ahead run.

Knoblauch later confessed that he saw the play as a "no-brainer" interference call, and he likely assumed that the ball would become dead. However, this interference call was the very call in dispute, and the umpire saw it differently. The Yankees thus lost that game, but still went on to win the series.
