= Bat-and-ball games =

Field games played by two opposing teams

Bat-and-ball games, or safe haven games, are field games played by two opposing teams. Typically, action starts when the fielding or defending team delivers a ball toward a dedicated player of the batting or attacking team, who tries to hit it with a bat and then run between various safe areas in the field to score runs (points). The defending team can use the ball in various ways against the attacking team's players to force them off the field ("get them out") when they are not in safe zones, and thus prevent them from further scoring. (Note: In some games for a small number of players, such as workup and the way old cat games, there are no teams and players rotate through the positions.) The best known modern bat-and-ball games are cricket and baseball, with common roots in the 18th-century games played in England.

== Roles ==
The teams alternate between "batting" (offensive role), sometimes called "in at bat" or simply in, and "fielding" (defensive role), also called "out in the field" or out. Only the batting team may score, but teams have equal opportunities in both roles. The game is counted rather than timed. The action starts when a player on the fielding team (the "bowler" or "pitcher") puts the ball in play with a delivery whose restriction depends on the game. A player on the batting team attempts to strike the delivered ball, commonly with a "bat", which is a club whose dimensions and other aspects are governed by the rules of the game. If the ball is not fairly delivered to the batter (i.e. not thrown within his reach), then penalties generally are awarded that help the batting team score.

The batter generally has an obligation to hit certain balls that are delivered within his reach (i.e. balls aimed at a designated area, known as the strike zone or wicket), and must hit the ball so that it is not caught by a fielder before it touches the ground. The most desirable outcome for the batter is generally to hit the ball out of the field, as this results in automatically scoring runs; however, in certain bat-and-ball games, this can result in a penalty against the batter. If the ball is struck into the field, then the batter may become a runner trying to reach a safe haven or "base"/"ground". While in contact with a base, the runner is "safe" from the fielding team and in a position to score runs. Leaving a safe haven places the runner in danger of being put out (eliminated). The teams switch roles when the fielding team 'puts out'/'gets out' enough of the batting team's players, which varies by game.

In modern baseball, the fielders put three players out. In cricket, they "dismiss" all players but one, though in some forms of cricket, there is a limit on the number of deliveries (scoring opportunities) that each team can have, such that the fielding team can become the batting team without getting anyone out. Some games permit multiple runners and some have multiple bases to run in sequence. Batting may occur, and running begin (and potentially end), at one of the bases. The movement between those "safe havens" is governed by the rules of the particular sport. The game ends when the losing team has completed the maximum number of innings (batting/scoring turns), which may range from 1 (as in limited-overs cricket) to 9 (as in baseball) or more. Ties are generally broken (if at all) by allowing each team to have an additional turn to score.

Some variations of bat-and-ball games do not feature bats, with batters instead using parts of their bodies to hit the ball; these variations may also give the batter possession of the ball at the start of each play, eliminating the defensive team's role in starting the action. A prominent example of this is Baseball5, one of the main sporting disciplines governed by the World Baseball Softball Confederation along with baseball and softball.

== History ==
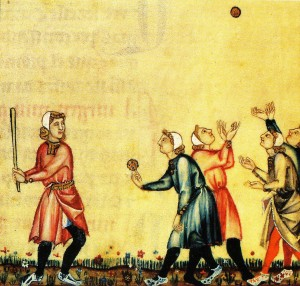
Young men playing a bat-and-ball game in a 13th-century manuscript of the Galician Cantigas de Santa Maria

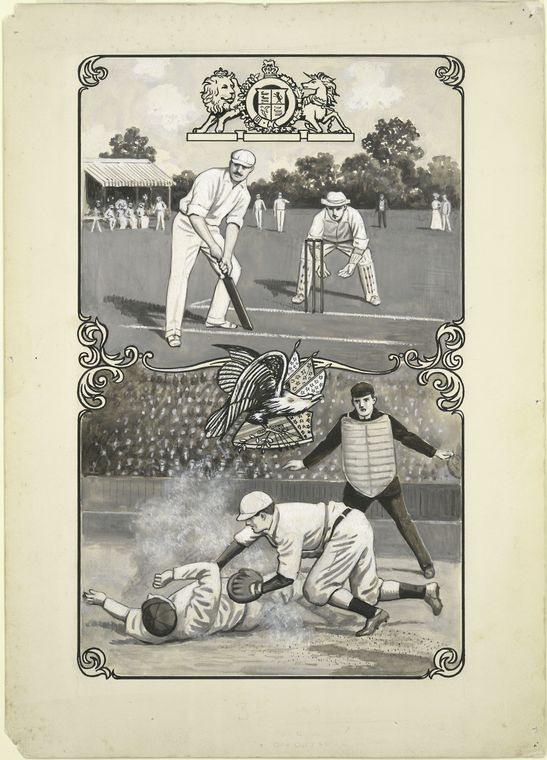
A depiction of baseball and first-class cricket in 19th century In the United States of America

The history of baseball's formation and rise in popularity took place in England (potentially influenced by or descended from games played in continental Europe) and then America. Predecessors of baseball were brought to America during the colonial era by English immigrants who played games similar to rounders; at the time, cricket was significantly more popular in the United States, since it was one of the main sports throughout the British Empire. However, the main format of cricket was first-class cricket, in which games lasted multiple days; baseball by comparison was a game that lasted less than two hours. Because of the vast difference in the duration of the two sports and for other reasons, such as the rising American desire to have some type of national game distinct from England's games, baseball began to grow in America, especially among some of the non-English demographics. Some attempts were made to nativize cricket in a way that would reduce its length and other perceived disadvantages relative to baseball; one example of this was wicket, an American variation of cricket which could be played in an afternoon.

But by the time of the 1860s Civil War, baseball had begun to overtake cricket in popularity; one reason for this was that troops during the Civil War preferred to play baseball, as it did not require a specialized playing surface like the cricket pitch. After the Civil War, baseball became a much more organized sport than cricket in America, with more money and competition available to baseball players across the country; thus, several professional cricket players switched to playing baseball, and cricket faded away in America. Baseball then began to spread throughout the Pacific Rim and the Americas, supported by the contemporary westward expansion of the United States. Over time, several variations of baseball appeared, with some being informal (kickball), others becoming professional sports in their own right (softball), and some even taking root overseas (pesäpallo).

In other countries that were part of the British Empire, cricket slowly emerged as the game of choice for the colonizers to spread their culture and values among the colonized. Some of the colonized people adapted to playing cricket in order to win the favor of the British, while in other cases, colonized peoples played cricket as a way of beating the British at their own sports, and thus proving themselves as equals. This helped to cement cricket as part of the national culture of several countries that later won their independence from the British.

=== Contemporary era ===
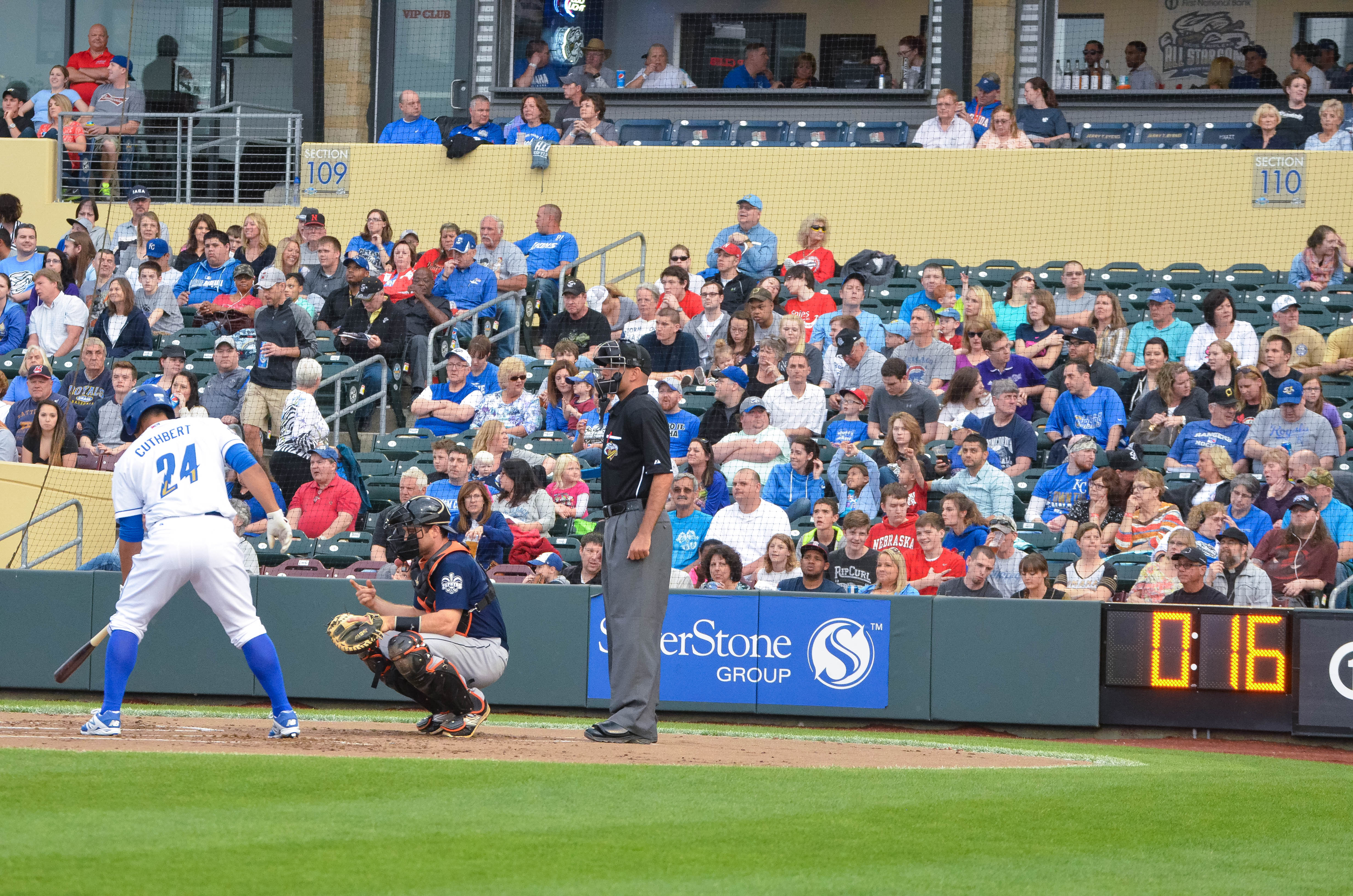
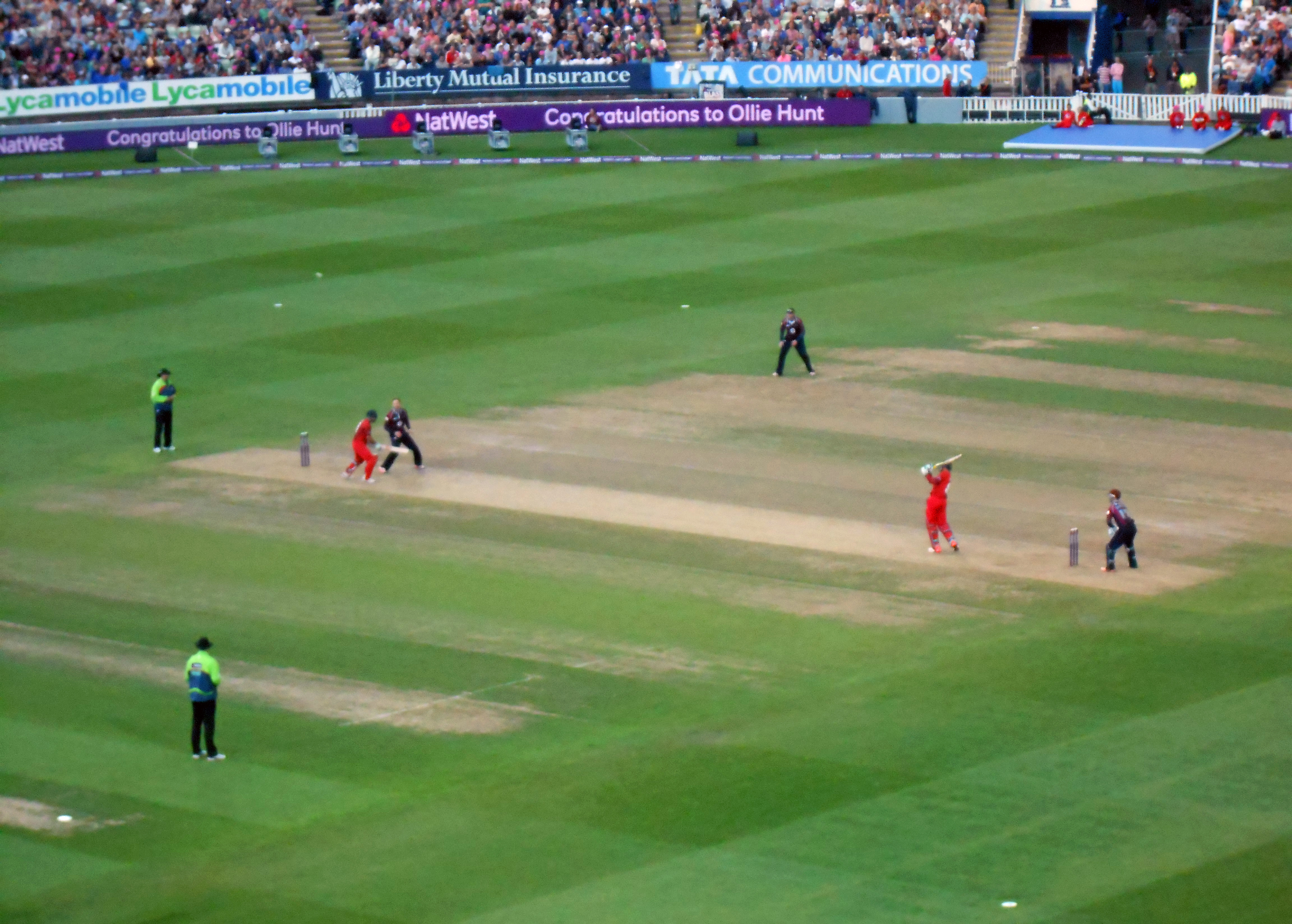
The advent of the pitch clock (left) and T20 cricket (right) have sped up baseball and cricket respectively, with the aim of attracting new fans.

In 1971, the ODI (One Day International) format of cricket was first played internationally; the ODI format shortened cricket from a five-day long game (Test cricket) to a one-day long game. In 2003, a new format of cricket called T20 cricket emerged which was designed to last only about three hours. By this time, the average MLB game had gone from being two hours long to about three hours long, so the two sports now had formats that were of a comparable duration. Later on, the T10 format of cricket, in which games last less than two hours, emerged at a domestic level, with leagues being started for it in several major cricket-playing countries.

== Types of bat-and-ball games ==
There is a great deal of variation among bat-and-ball games; for example, more runs are generally scored in a cricket match than dozens of baseball games combined, and while a T10 cricket match generally ends in 90 minutes, a Test cricket batter may bat for hours over several consecutive days. Overall, most bat-and-ball games can be categorized as being longball, baseball-like or cricket-like, with many of them following the same basic outline:

- Baseball-like games: The batter must generally "put the ball into play" by hitting it, generally into a limited area (i.e. "fair territory") of the field of play, before being able to run around the various safe havens. In many situations, runners (including the batter) are "forced" to advance to the next safe haven, with runners being put out when an opponent with the ball either touches the base they are forced to advance to before they do, or touches them while they are not safe. A run is scored when a runner reaches the final base, which is generally the fourth base, with the runner then leaving the field until their next turn as a batter.
  - The batter may have a limited number of attempts to hit the ball into the proper area of the field, with the risk of being out if they fail. Similarly, the pitcher (defensive player who delivers the ball) may be punished for throwing the ball out of the batter's reach too many times, with the batter then receiving a free pass to the first base.
  - Some variations of baseball, such as Tee-ball and Baseball5, do not feature a pitcher, with batters potentially automatically out for failing to legally hit the ball.
- Longball subfamily (lapta, schlagball, palant, etc.): Two safe havens and a field between them. The aim of the fielding team was to win the position of the batting team, while the aim of the batting team was to defend its position at the home base. One signature form of getting out attacking players is by hitting runners with the ball. For scoring a run, runner must make a full trip back-and-forth between both safe havens.
- Cricket-like games: The ball is in play after being delivered regardless of whether or where to it is struck, meaning runs can be scored off of every delivery. A run is scored every time a batsman reaches a safe haven other than the one they were last in, with there being two safe havens, though the rules usually require that two batsmen do this (while crossing each other) for the run to be scored. Players from the batting team are dismissed when the ball touches the wicket in a safe haven with no batsman in it.
  - For games that are meant to be finished in a shorter time span, as it is often much more difficult to get batsmen out in cricket-like games than in baseball-like games, there is generally either a time limit (in which case neither team wins unless the game ends before the time limit) or a limit on how many legal deliveries each team needs to perform while fielding (e.g. each team may only have to deliver the ball a maximum of 100 times). Illegal deliveries are deliveries which are not within the batter's reach, or which are not delivered at a reasonable distance/angle to the batter.

As a broad rule, baseball-type games favour the player who delivers the ball, and a scoring success for the batting player is notable; in cricket-type games, the player batting is favoured and scoring is regular and common, while a success for the player delivering the ball (i.e. a wicket) is notable.

== Common features ==
This list may not apply to all bat-and-ball games, but covers certain features common to many of them:

=== Running rules ===
- Only the "first" player to reach a safe haven is protected by it (i.e. both batters can not stay in the same batsman's ground in cricket to avoid a runout, with the first of the two to have reached being the only one protected from being out. In a similar vein, in baseball, the player who initially reached a base can, until they reach the next base, generally return to that base to be safe, regardless of whether a teammate behind them on the basepath is also occupying that base).
  - Schlagball and Lapta allow multiple runners at a safe haven.
- Runners may be called out for passing other runners; that is, if one runner improperly advances further around the safe havens than another runner.
  - In cricket, there is no such penalty.

=== Strategy ===
- Batters have some latitude in terms of how far or when to run when scoring (i.e. a baseball batter may stop at 1st base or continue to 2nd if they desire, though their choice also depends on whether there is a runner at 2nd or 3rd; see Base running), and this creates a risk-reward decision that could result in either more runs or more outs.
  - Generally, the further the ball is hit from the fielders, the more time this affords for running and thus scoring.
- There may be decisions on where to place fielders (see Infield shift) in anticipation of where a batter may hit the ball, or decisions on how and who best to deliver the ball to the batter so as to prevent them from hitting it and scoring (see Bowling).

=== Player roles ===
- Substitution of players:
  - Cricket does not allow substitution, except for fielders to temporarily leave the field.
  - Other bat-and-ball games allow substitution, with baseball not permitting players who are substituted out to play any further role in the game.
- How batters alternate the batting:
  - In cricket, the two safe havens are occupied at all times by one player each from the batting team. The ball is delivered to the player standing in one of the safe havens, with the two players being a batting pair that face all deliveries for their team until one of them is dismissed, at which point another player from the batting team comes to occupy the now-unoccupied safe haven.
    - The batting order is not fixed, and a player who has been gotten out is eliminated from play until their team's turn to bat is over.
  - In baseball and other sports, every time the batter tries to run to one of the bases, regardless of whether they safely reached or not, another batter comes in to bat.
    - These games can have a fixed batting order, and players can bat unlimited times in an inning.
- How pitchers/bowlers alternate the delivering: In both baseball and cricket, any fielder can switch roles with the pitcher/bowler.
  - In limited overs cricket, each bowler has a limited number of legal deliveries they can bowl. In addition, bowlers can swap only after they have bowled the 6 legal deliveries of the over.
  - It is very rare in the top levels of baseball for a fielder to switch positions with the pitcher, as pitching is a highly specialized skill. Instead, a new pitcher will typically come in from the bullpen whenever one is needed, and the previous pitcher will then exit the game. A position player may pitch during a blowout, in which the manager does not want to needlessly tire his pitchers, or if no pitchers remain available to enter the game, as sometimes occurs deep into extra innings.

=== Scoring ===
- How runs are scored by running:
  - In cricket, there is one player from the batting team in each safe haven, and one run is scored when both of these players swap safe havens. There is no limit to the number of runs they may score.
  - In various baseball-like as well as Schlagball, lapta, etc., a runner must complete a full trip around all of the bases to score a run.
- Penalties for not properly touching the necessary safe havens when running:
  - In cricket, it is considered a short run if a batsman does not touch the ground he is running towards, meaning the run does not score.
  - In baseball, runners can be put out by an appeal play if they have not touched each base in the proper order.
- Alternative ways to score runs:
  - A ball that is hit very far (such as to the edge of, or out of the field) through the air (such as a home run or six), or potentially in a specific area or place, such as in Bat-and-Trap, may automatically give the batting team some runs.

=== Elimination of batting players ===
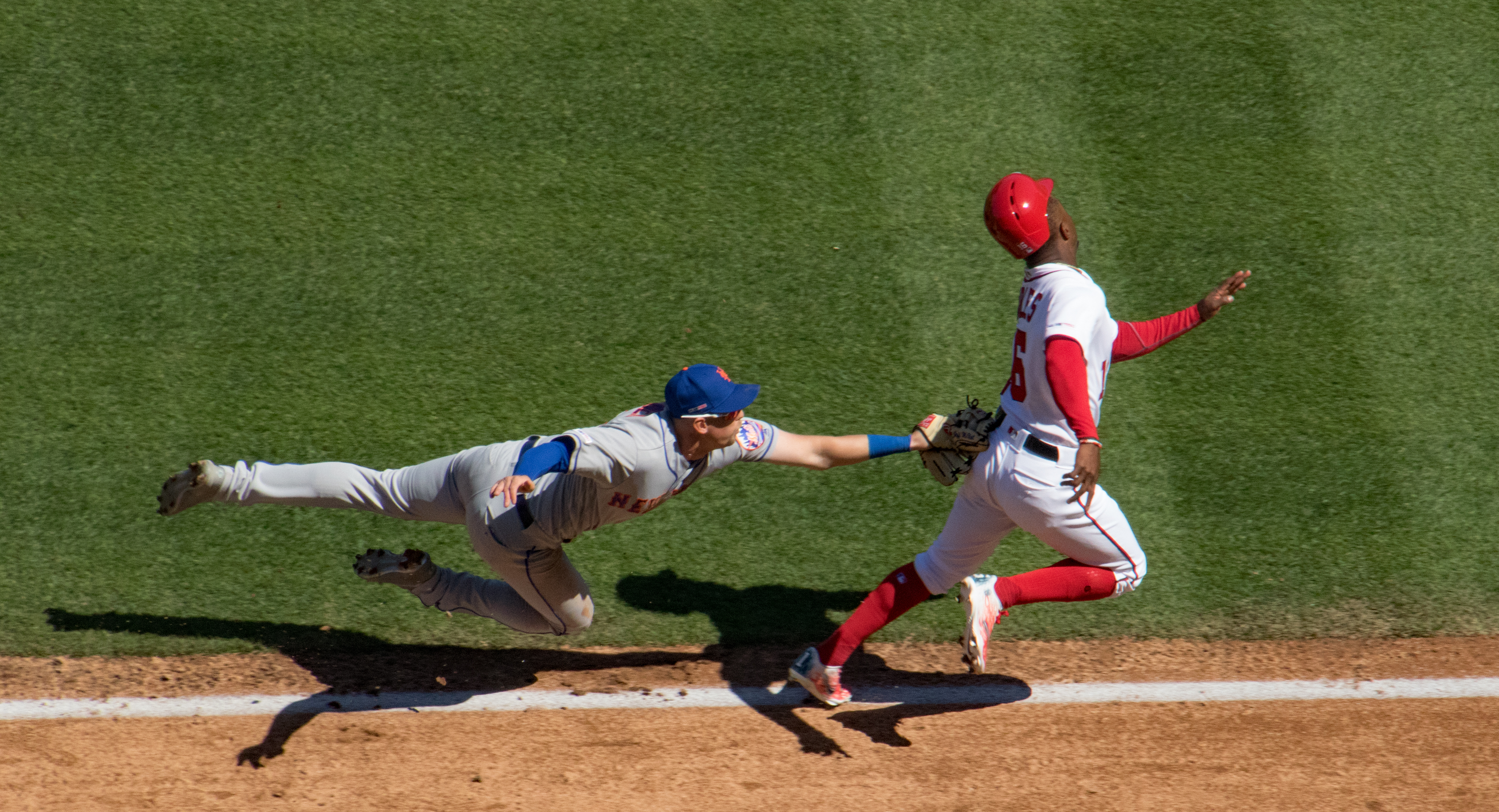
- A runner can be retired in baseball if tagged while not on a base.
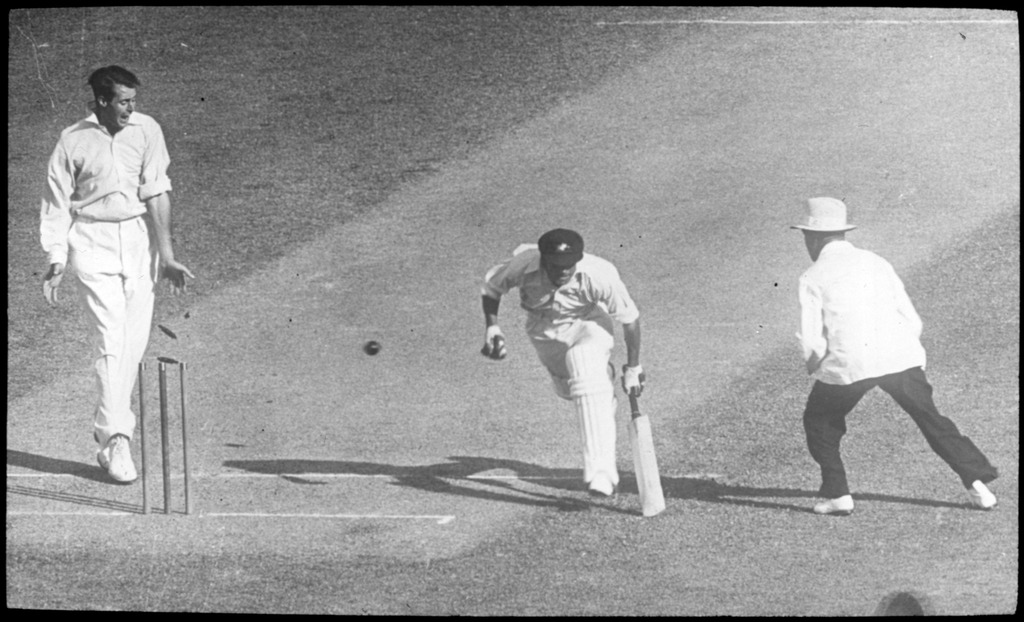
  A cricket batter is run out if a wicket is hit by the ball before the batter crosses the crease near the wicket. (In the image above, the batter barely avoids being run out.)
  Ways for a batter to get out:
  - When a batter hits a ball in the air that is caught by a fielder without bouncing, the fielding team gets closer to getting the batting team out, or otherwise receives an advantage.
    - In baseball and cricket, catches get the batter out.
      - In early forms of baseball, the ball could bounce once before being caught. The "one hand, one bounce" rule of street cricket is similar.
      - When a catch is made, any runs scored before the catch on that delivery are nullified, with any runners other than the batter potentially being at risk of being out as well (see Tagging up).
    - In Schlagball, a one-handed catch taken "without bobbling" earns the fielding team a point.
    - A fielder must remain within the field of play for the catch to be valid.
  - The batter may have a "strike zone" or "wicket" in their batting area which they must bat the ball away from. (In baseball, 3 unhit deliveries in the strike zone get a batter out, while one ball hitting a batter's wicket gets them out in cricket).
- Ways for a runner/running player to get out:
  - In baseball, there are certain situations where a runner is forced to go to a particular base. In these situations, the runner is out if a fielder holding the ball touches that base before the runner reaches it.
    - Situation #1: the batter must always advance to first base upon hitting the ball into fair territory.
    - Situation #2: any runner must advance to the next base if they are on a base that a teammate must advance to.
    - Situation #3: runners must return to their bases if the batter gets out because of a catch by a fielder.
  - Another way for a runner to be put out in baseball is if they are not on a base when tagged by a fielder holding the ball.
  - In cricket, a batter is dismissed while running if they attempt to score a run (by running towards the opposite crease line) and a fielder throws the ball at the wicket beyond the crease line, and hits it, before the batter crosses it.

=== Delivery of the ball ===
- Penalties are rewarded to the batting team if the ball is not delivered "fairly" to the batter (e.g. is not thrown from far away enough, or is thrown out of the batter's reach)
  - In cricket, a run is awarded to the batting team if the ball is not delivered within the batter's reach, or if the bowler violates one of several rules while bowling the ball (such as bowling while the front foot is past the crease that the bowler is not supposed to cross).
    - In addition to the extra run, unfair deliveries do not count towards the limited number of deliveries teams have to score off in certain forms of cricket. There are also fewer ways for a batter to get out on an illegal delivery. If the unfair delivery was a no-ball, then in certain forms of cricket, this results in the batters getting a free hit on the next delivery, meaning that there are also fewer ways for the batter to get out on the next delivery.
  - In baseball, a pitch thrown out of the strike zone (which the batter does not swing at) is considered a ball. 4 balls result in the batter "walking" to first base, and if there are already runners on first base, second base, and third base, then this results in 1 run scoring. On rare occasion, a pitcher may walk 4 or more consecutive batters, resulting in the batting team scoring runs solely due to the 16 or more balls.
  - The legally required distance for the ball to be delivered from the bowler/pitcher to the batter is generally about 20 metres (66 ft).
- The ball may be delivered through the air to the batter, or it might bounce on the ground before reaching them. (See bowling (cricket))

=== Field ===
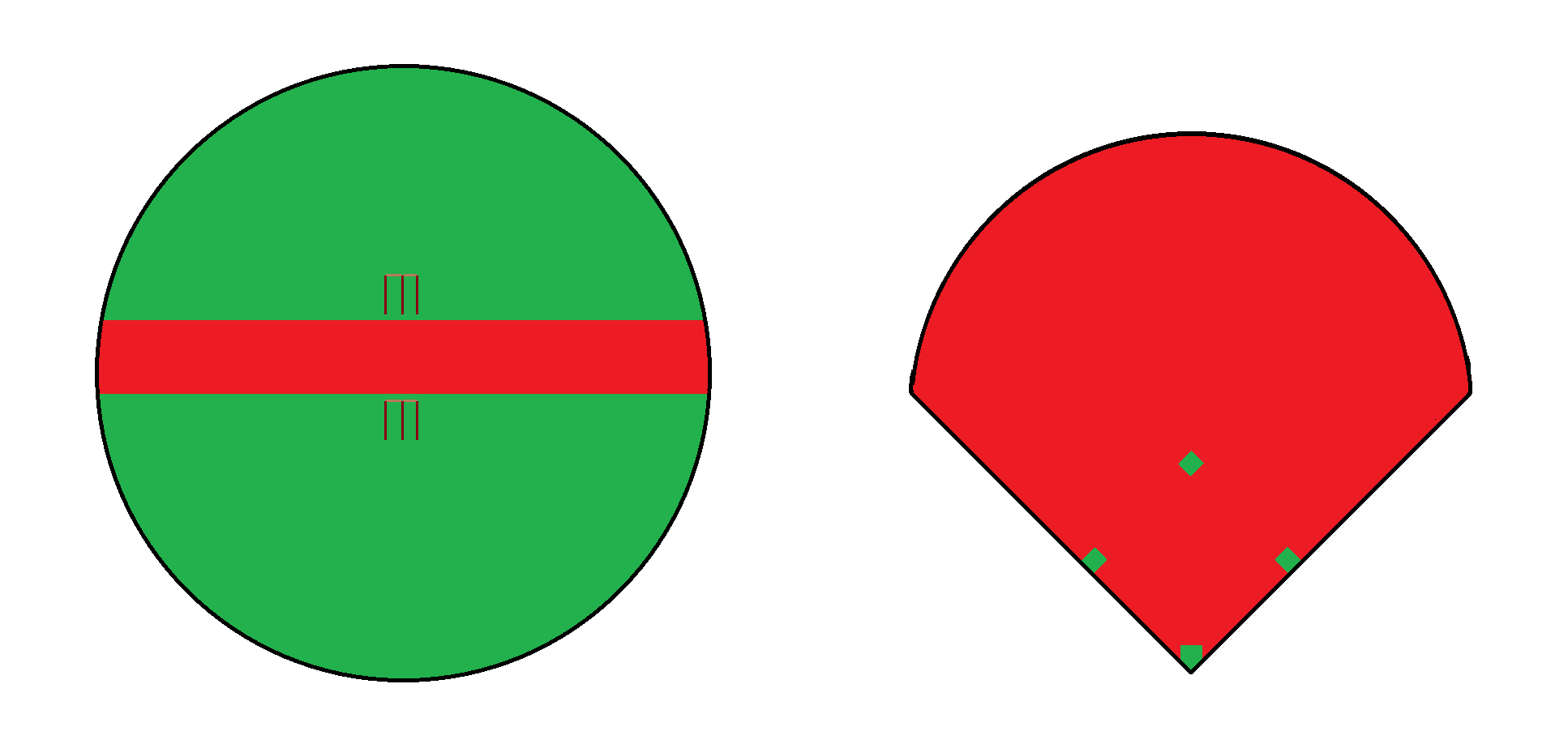
The safe havens of a cricket field (left) and baseball field (right) are depicted in green.

In cricket and baseball, the playing field is large (at the highest levels of each sport, the minimum distance between the two furthest ends of the field is about 400 to 500 feet (120 to 150 m)), and is divided into an infield and outfield (based on proximity to the batting area).

Cricket has the delivery and hitting of the ball done in the same area where the batters can run (the cricket pitch), while baseball does the running in a separate area. The distance between the two batsmen's grounds in cricket (the areas that batsmen run between to score runs) is 58 feet (18 m) (though batsmen may run slightly less distance, since they are allowed to use their bats to touch their grounds), while the distance between bases in baseball is 90 feet (27 m) and in softball is 60 feet (18 m).

Most bat-and-ball games have playing area in front of the batter (such as Schlagball), but may (like baseball) restrict batters from hitting the ball behind themselves or too far to the side; see foul territory. Bat-and-ball sports can be modified to be played in an indoor court. For example, indoor cricket takes place in a 30 by 12 metres (98 ft × 39 ft) facility, while Baseball5 is played on a 21 metres (69 ft)-square field.

==== Fielding positions ====
In baseball-like games, the fielders (also known as "position players") operate in a standard set of baseball positions because it is generally possible to cover most of the field by spacing the fielders out in certain ways. By contrast, the significantly larger cricket field has many possible cricket fielding positions, with the 11 fielders occupying the slips cordon behind the batter, or other areas of the field.

=== Game length ===
T20 cricket and baseball both last about 3 hours, while other forms of cricket can last either multiple days or less than three hours. Informal bat-and-ball games may take place in shorter periods of time, and in general, the possibility of a team's batters getting out rapidly in succession makes it theoretically possible for certain periods of play in most bat-and-ball games to end quicker than usual, with the opposite also being possible in some cases. Both baseball and cricket can theoretically go forever, since baseball games end only after a certain number of outs and innings in cricket can be prolonged by illegal deliveries; however, in limited overs cricket, fielding teams are penalized if they do not bowl enough legal deliveries at a certain rate, which essentially imposes a time limit of sorts on these types of games.

- The game may be played for a certain number of innings.
  - There can potentially be time restrictions (as in Test cricket), or the possibility of a game being suspended and resumed at a later date if necessary.
  - The trailing team can end up batting more times than the other team and still lose, potentially because it was forced to do so by the other team.
- There may be no restriction on the number of innings, deliveries, or time.

==== Pace of play ====
In some bat-and-ball sports, there are team penalties designed to ensure the game goes at a faster pace. For example, in various formats of cricket, there are over rate penalties which kick in if a team has bowled too few deliveries within an allotted amount of time, while in some baseball leagues, there is a pitch clock that penalizes batters and pitchers for taking too much time between pitches.

==== Result ====
Bat-and-ball games are played until:

- In baseball and Timeless Test cricket, the trailing team must complete all of its scheduled batting turns.
  - 5-day Test cricket also has the potential of a draw, which occurs when time runs out before the non-leading team(s) complete all of their batting turns, thus effectively yielding no result for the game.
- In bete-ombro and early forms of baseball, a game can be played until either team scores a certain number of runs.

Ties can be dealt with in several ways:

- The tie may simply be considered a tie.
- An additional inning(s), either full-size or abbreviated, may be added to the game, with this potentially repeating until the tie is broken.
  - Cricket has a Super Over of at most 6 additional legal deliveries per team.
  - If the Super over is also a tie then each player will take a turn trying to hit the wicket, which is known as wicket - hitting in cricket.
  - Baseball has extra innings.

===== Run chases =====
When one of the teams is not leading and only they have completed all of their allotted batting turns, this allows the other team to win automatically by surpassing the number of runs scored by the first team. In cricket, this situation is referred to as a "run chase", with the "target" of the batting team being the number of runs scored by the other team plus one. In baseball, the home team can be considered to be chasing, with the aim of scoring the "walk-off" (winning) runs, when they are not leading anytime after the eighth inning, as a regulation game sees the trailing team bat at least nine times and the teams alternating the batting, with the home team always batting last.

===== Margin of victory =====
In addition to the number of runs a team won by over their opponents, other factors which are relevant to determining which team wins, such as the number of outs or legal deliveries that were remaining in the batting team's turn (if they won/there was a limit on either resource), can be included with the statement of the result. The result may also mention how many more times the losing team batted than the winning team.

==== Shortened games ====
In some circumstances (e.g. bad weather), a complete game may not be possible in its originally envisioned timeframe because of weather or other reasons. In baseball-like games, which generally have many innings, it is possible to call the result of a game after both teams have batted only a few of their scheduled turns, or otherwise to finish/replay the game at a later date. In cricket, however, which is generally played to only one or two batting turns per team, a match may not be callable for the simple reason that only one of the teams has had the chance to score so far. However, cricket matches that are interrupted by rain can still be considered completable so long as there is enough time left in the match to allow the second-batting team to face a sufficiently long batting turn; in these circumstances, a rain rule is applied such that any runs scored by the first-batting team are usually devalued.

=== Terminology ===
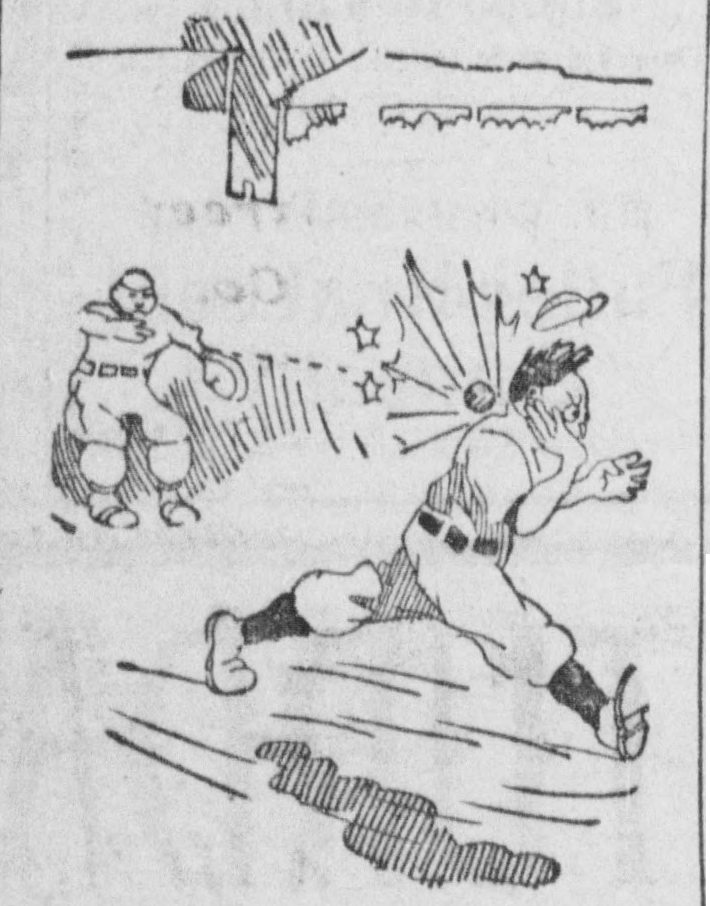
In early baseball, soaking was a method of getting out runners

Here are some terms or concepts common to many bat-and-ball games:

- The person who delivers the ball to the batter: the bowler, pitcher
- The main fielder, who receives the delivered ball, usually behind the batter: the catcher, wicketkeeper
- Getting the batter out by delivering the ball at something near the batter, when the batter does not hit the ball: strike out, bowled
- The act of getting the batter or runner out when they are not in a safe haven:
  - If the ball is thrown at the runner: plugging, soaking (see Schlagball)
  - If a fielder touches the runner with ball in hand: tag out
  - If a fielder gets the ball to the safe haven before the runner does: force out, runout
- getting a batter out by catching the ball when hit in the air by the batter: fly out, caught out
- The points both teams score: runs
- The safe havens: base, ground
- A ball hit out of the field of play through the air: home run, six,

=== Equipment ===
- Bat: generally resembles the round shape of a baseball bat or the flat shape of the larger cricket bat. Other designs include something similar to a hockey stick, a spoon (see wicket (sport)) or a racquet (stoolball).
- Ball: Often about as large as a softball.
  - Can be very hard, or softer, like in tennis ball cricket.
- Protective equipment for the batter and/or fielders, ranging from helmets to gloves.

In the field, there may be:

- Physical markers for the safe havens (such as bases, wickets, and lines like the crease (cricket))
- Physical markers for the "strike zone" near the batter (see the target in Vitilla)
- A physical boundary for the field (see the fence in baseball)
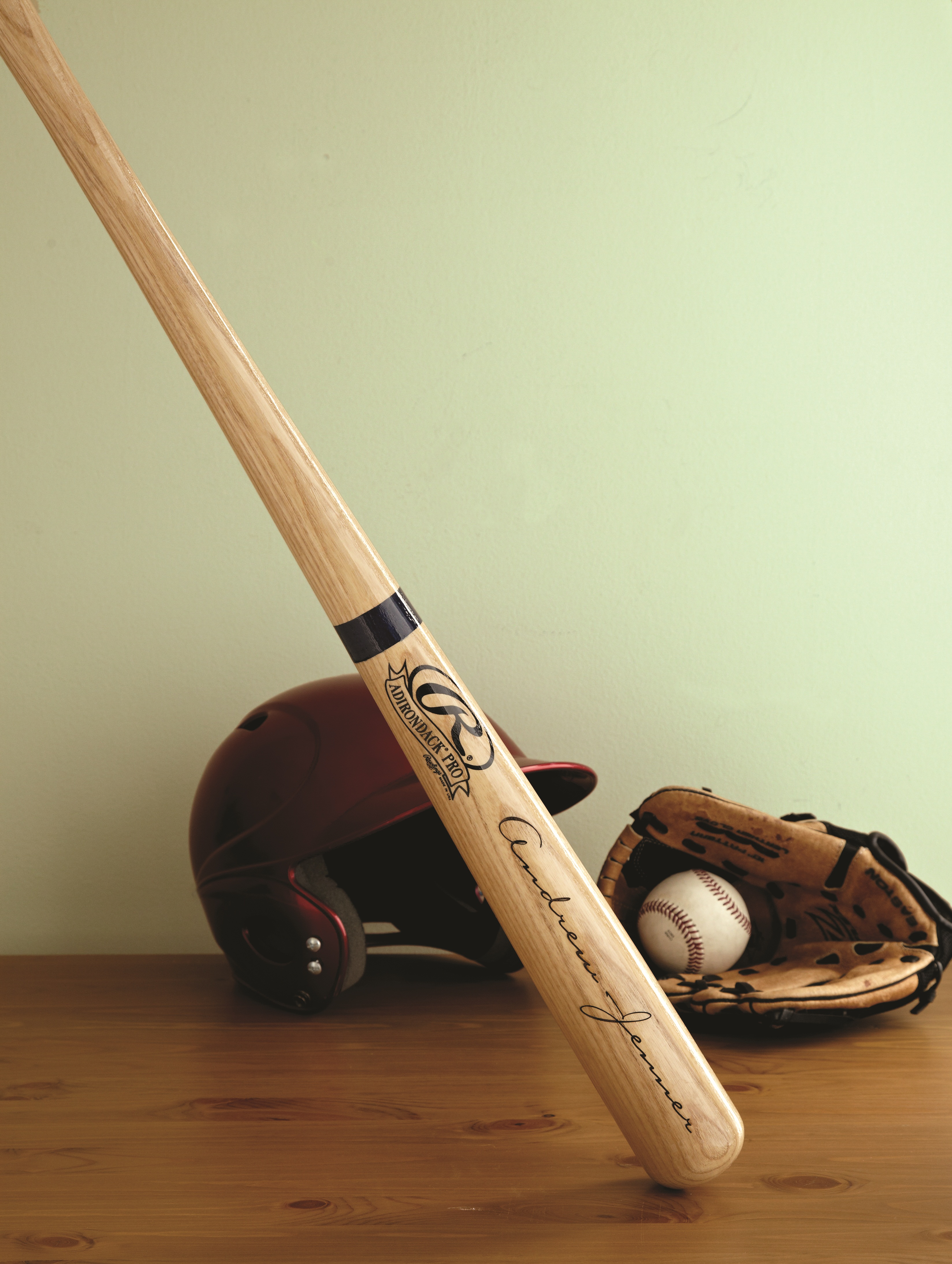
Baseball

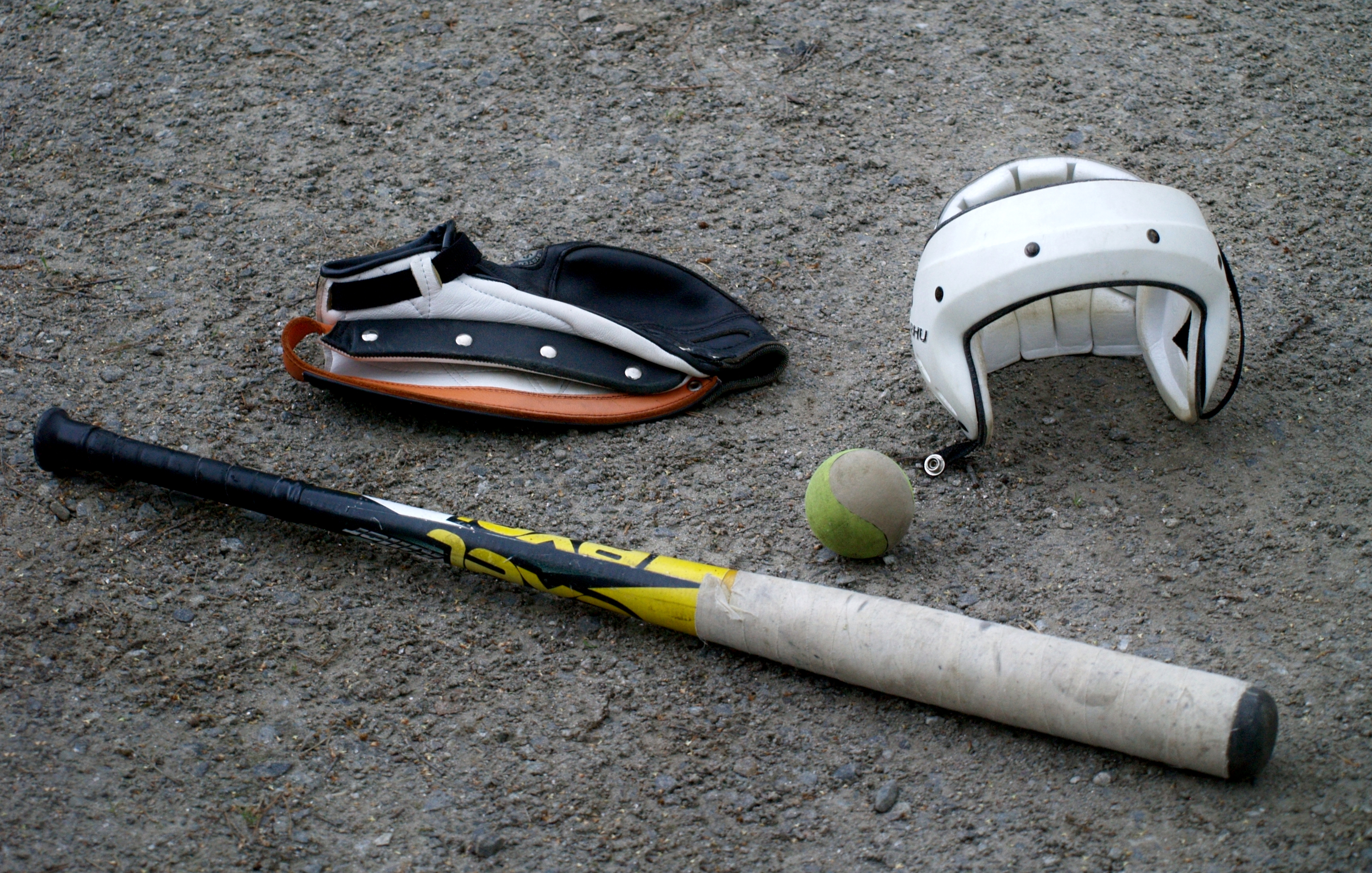
Pesäpallo

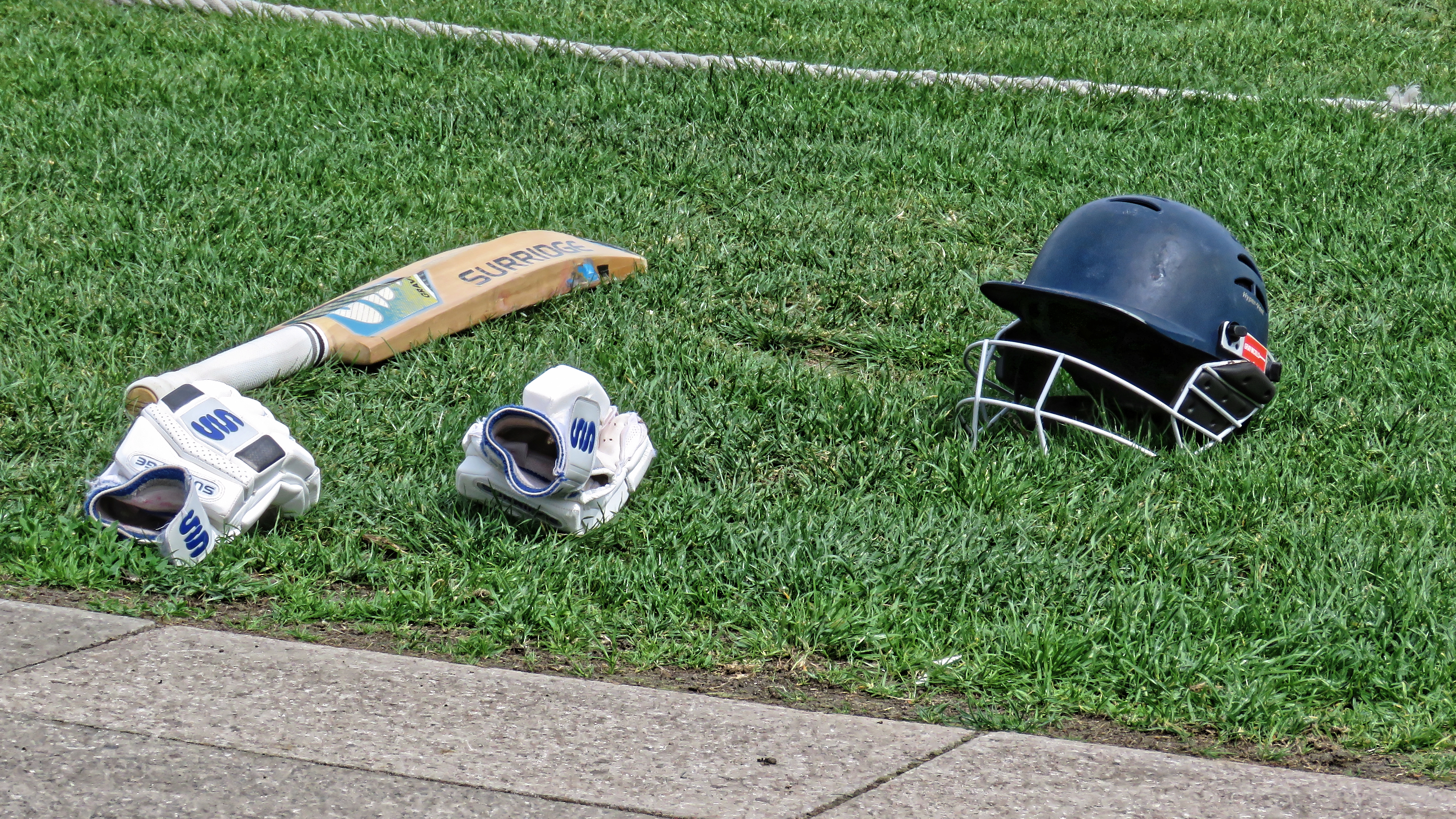
Cricket

=== Informal variants ===
Bat-and-ball games can be played with modified rules in unorthodox places, such as in the street or the backyard. Oftentimes, players are forbidden or penalized for hitting the ball out of the field into an area where it would be hard to reach, and play may be modified so as to ensure all players have an opportunity to participate, such as in Kwik cricket.

== Tournaments ==
At the international level, the World Baseball Classic is the premier baseball tournament. For cricket, the ODI World Cup, ICC T20 World Cup, and ICC World Test Championship are the premier tournaments. The Pesäpallo World Cup is played every 3 years. At the domestic level, baseball tends to be played in leagues with 2 major divisions, with the playoffs being contested in a best-of-seven format. T20 leagues in cricket tend to have 6 to 8 teams and follow the Page playoff system (two semi-finals, with an additional match played to determine which team enters the second semi-final, followed by a final).

== List of bat-and-ball games ==
Notable bat-and-ball games include:

=== Baseball-like games ===
- Baseball and variants
  - Barnstorming
    - Banana Ball
    - Cosmic baseball
  - Beeball
  - Blind baseball
    - Beep baseball
  - Chapitas
  - Extreme Baseball
  - Half-rubber
  - Historic
    - Knickerbocker Rules
    - The Massachusetts Game – four bases
    - Town ball – variable
    - Vintage base ball
  - Indian Ball
  - Japanese-style baseball
  - No base running
    - Corkball – four bases
      - Fuzzball (sport)
    - Wiffleball
  - Over-the-line
  - Sandlot ball
  - Sans bat
    - Baseball5
    - Bolita de cancha
    - Cuatro esquinas
    - Hotbox
    - Kickball
      - Matball
    - Pelotica de goma
    - Punchball
    - Rigoball
    - Stoop ball
    - Wireball
  - Scrub baseball – four bases (not a team game per se)
  - Snow baseball
  - Softball
    - 16-inch softball
    - Fast-pitch softball
  - Stickball – variable
    - Vitilla – three bases
  - Tee-ball
  - Women baseball

==== Similar to baseball (roundball) ====
- British baseball (Pêl-Fas) – four posts
- Elle
- Pesäpallo – four bases
- Rap7 ball
- Rounders – four bases or posts
  - GAA rounders

=== Cricket-like games ===
- Cricket
  - Backyard cricket
  - Club cricket
  - First-class cricket
    - Test cricket
      - Timeless Test
  - French cricket
  - Ice cricket
  - Indoor cricket
    - Indoor cricket (UK variant)
  - Kilikiti
  - Kwik cricket
  - Last man stands cricket
  - Limited overs cricket
    - List A cricket
      - ODI
    - Short form cricket
      - 100-ball cricket
      - T10 cricket
      - Twenty20
        - T20I
  - Parasports
    - Blind cricket
    - Deaf cricket
    - One-armed versus one-legged cricket
    - Table Cricket
  - Sans bat
    - Kick-it cricket
    - Leg cricket
  - Single wicket
    - Continuous cricket
      - Tip-and-Run cricket
  - Softball cricket
  - Tennis ball cricket
    - Tape ball cricket
  - Trobriand cricket
  - Windball cricket
  - Women cricket
    - Women Test
    - Women ODI
    - Women T20
- Bete-ombro
- Crocker
- Plaquita
- Stoolball – two stools
- Vigoro – two wickets
- Wicket

=== Longball-like games ===
- Danish longball
- Brännboll
- Lapta – two salos (bases)
- Oina
- Palant
- Schlagball – also called Deutschball, "German ball"

=== Other games ===
- Bat and trap
- Gillidanda
- Old cat and variants
- Pärk

=== Hybrid bat-and-ball games ===
- Composite rules baseball–softball – a hybrid bat-and-ball sports which combines the elements of baseball and softball, played on the large identical baseball diamond with the larger ball, ten rather than nine innings, and allowing pitching the ball either underarm, overarm, or sidearm.
- Composite rules baseball–cricket – a hybrid bat-and-ball games combining elements of baseball and cricket, played by two teams of 12 players with the 9 inches (230 mm) diameter baseball on the oval-shaped field about 220 yards (200 m) long by 176 yards (161 m) wide, at the center of which is a baseball field about 92 feet (28 m) apart with the rectangular 66.5 feet (20.3 m) by 12 feet (3.7 m) pitching area roughly at a distance between the pitcher and two batters (consists of the striking batter and non-striking batter), equidistant between first and third base, and a few feet closer to home plate than to second base. The objective is one batter (striking batter) on and at the right batter's box is pitched to, other batter (non-striking batter) stands on the left batter's box, then the striking batter must hit it and batter must runs around the bases in the normal counterclockwise direction, while the non-striking batter runs around bases in a clockwise direction at the same time. The game could last 12 innings of five overs.

=== Games without a bowler/pitcher ===
==== Gilli Danda ====
Gilli Danda (which is related to several other traditional games in other parts of the world) is a South Asian game with similarities to baseball and cricket. The aim of the game is for the batter to knock a stick on the ground up into the air using a stick held in the hand, and then to hit the airborne stick as far as possible. The batter is out if the stick is caught by a player on the other team before it touches the ground. Points are earned either based on the distance the stick travels, or by the batter running to a designated area while the fielders collect the batted stick and throw it back to the hitting area to try to get the batter out. The game ends after each team has batted once, with each team batting until all of its players are out.

=== Non-bat-and-ball games ===
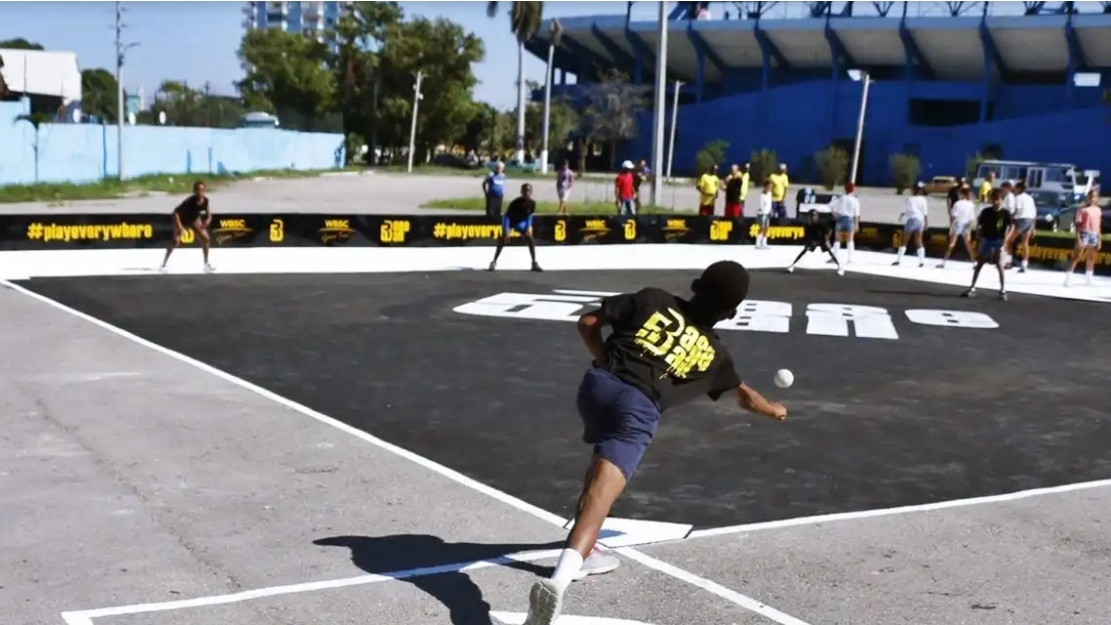
A Baseball5 batter hitting the ball

Striking the ball with a "bat" or any type of stick, or having the defensive team deliver the ball to the batter, is not crucial. These games use the foot or hand to hit the ball, and make it significantly easier to hit the ball overall, either by placing significant restrictions on the way the defensive team delivers the ball to the batter, or by giving the batter possession of the ball at the start of each play. Otherwise their rules may be similar or even identical to baseball or cricket. The first two use a large (35 cm) soft ball.

Using the legs:

- Kickball – four bases, sometimes called soccer baseball
  - Matball – kickball with gym mats for bases
- Leg cricket – two batsmen's grounds, foot used to propel the ball rather than a bat

Using the hands:

- Baseball5 – four bases, played at an international level (batter starts each play with ball)
- Punchball – four bases, sometimes called volleyball-style baseball or slug

Involving throwing:

- Stoop ball – ball is thrown against the steps of a stairway, and fielding is done on the rebound

== Main games ==
Sport			Baseball-like (roundball)								Cricket-like			Longball		
Sport			Rounders		Welsh	Baseball				Pesäpallo	Stoolball	Cricket		Longball		
Sport			English	Gaelic	Welsh	Hardball	Softball	Baseball5	Vitilla	Pesäpallo	Stoolball	Outdoor	Indoor	Lapta	Oină	Schlagball
Image																
Country of origin			England	Ireland	Wales	United States		Derived from Latin American informal games	Dominican Republic	Finland	England	England	Australia	Russia	Romania	Germany
Governing body			Rounders England	GAA	IBB	WBSC				Finnish Pesäpallo Association	Stoolball England	ICC	WICF	Russian Lapta Federation	Romanian Oină Federation	
Field	Shape			Square		Non standardized	Circular quadrant	Square	Circular sextant	Irregular hexagon	Circle	Oval	Rectangular cuboid	Oblong rectangle	Oblong rectangle	Oblong rectangle + isosceles trapezoid
Field	Infield		Irregular pentagon: 12 meters between first, second and third posts (each other) and 8.5 meters between third and fourth post	Square of 25 meters per side	Quadrilateral of 66 feet (20 m) per side (51 feet (16 m) distance between third and fourth post)	Diamond: square of 90 feet (27 m) per side	Diamond: square of 60 feet (18 m) per side	Square of 13 metres (43 ft) per side	Equilateral triangle of 50 feet (15 m) per side	315 feet (96 m) × 138 feet (42 m)	Pitch: 16 yards (15 m) × 1 yard (0.91 m)	From each middle stumps: 30 yards (27 m) (radius)	Pitch: 20 meters length × 2.44 meters width			70 meters × 25 meters
Field	Infield		Irregular pentagon: 12 meters between first, second and third posts (each other) and 8.5 meters between third and fourth post	Square of 25 meters per side	Quadrilateral of 66 feet (20 m) per side (51 feet (16 m) distance between third and fourth post)	Grass line: 95 feet (29 m) radius from center of pitcher mound	Grass line: 60 feet (18 m) radius from center of pitcher circle	Square of 13 metres (43 ft) per side	Equilateral triangle of 50 feet (15 m) per side	315 feet (96 m) × 138 feet (42 m)	Pitch: 16 yards (15 m) × 1 yard (0.91 m)	Pitch: 22 yards (20 m) × 10 feet (3.0 m)	Pitch: 20 meters length × 2.44 meters width			70 meters × 25 meters
Field	Outfield/total			Square of 70 meters per side		From home plate apex:				109–168 metres (358–551 ft) (to center field fence)	From pitch center: 45 yards (41 m) (radius)	From pitch center: 65–90 yards (59–82 m) (radius)	28–30 meters length × 10.5–12 meters width × 4–4.5 meters height	40–55 meters × 25–40 meters	70 meters × 32 meters	Area between divergent diagonals of 140 meters behing rear flags (long-hitting field)
Field	Outfield/total			Square of 70 meters per side		275 feet (84 m) or more (to each foul pole); 375 feet (114 m) (to right/left center fields fence); 400 feet (120 m) (to center field fence)	220–250 feet (67–76 m) (radius)	18 metres (59 ft) (square), fence: 1 metre (3.3 ft) height	100 feet (30 m) (radius)	109–168 metres (358–551 ft) (to center field fence)	From pitch center: 45 yards (41 m) (radius)	From pitch center: 65–90 yards (59–82 m) (radius)	28–30 meters length × 10.5–12 meters width × 4–4.5 meters height	40–55 meters × 25–40 meters	70 meters × 32 meters	Area between divergent diagonals of 140 meters behing rear flags (long-hitting field)
Field	Delivery zone		Bowler square: 2.5 meters per side, 7.5 meters from batter square	Pitcher stand: Square of 64 centimeters per side, 12 meters from homebase	Bowling box: 11 feet (3.4 m) × 3 feet (0.91 m), 50 feet (15 m) from batting crease	Pitcher mound: circle of 18 feet (5.5 m) diameter, which center is 726 inches (18.4 m) from home plate apex, and above 10 inches (0.25 m) from home plate level	Pitcher circle: circle of 8 feet (2.4 m) radius, which center is 43–46 feet (13–14 m) from home plate apex	Batter box: Square of 3 metres (9.8 ft) per side	45 feet (14 m) from home plate apex	Home base: semicircle of 2.7 metres (8.9 ft) radius	Behind bowling crease and between return creases	Behind popping crease and between return creases		Pitcher pad: 3 meters wide	Semicircle or 3 meters radius	Behind batting crease
Field	Batting zone		Batter square: 2 meters per side	Batter box: Square of 4 meters per side	Batting crease: 3 feet (0.91 m) wide	Batter boxes: 2 rectangles of 6 feet (1.8 m) × 4 feet (1.2 m), 29 inches (0.74 m) apart from each other	Batter boxes: 2 rectangles of 7 feet (2.1 m) × 3 feet (0.91 m), 29 inches (0.74 m) apart from each other	Batter box: Square of 3 metres (9.8 ft) per side	Batter boxes	Home base: semicircle of 2.7 metres (8.9 ft) radius	Before wicket	Before bowling crease		Pitcher pad: 3 meters wide	Semicircle or 3 meters radius	Behind batting crease
Field	Safe havens		4 (posts)	4 (bases)	4 (posts)	4 (bases)			3 (bases)	4 (bases)	2 (stools)	2 (batter grounds)		2 (house and end lines)	2 (batting and back zones)	2 (batting crease and touch posts)
Field	Foul zones		No	Yes	No	Yes				Yes	No	No		Yes	Yes	Yes
Field	Surface					Grass and dirt				Thin dirt, sand, artificial grass		Grass and dirt		Grass, artificial	Grass	
Equipment	Ball	Type	Layered solid	Layered solid	Layered solid	Layered solid	Layered solid	Filled with air, non inflatable	Bottle cap shape	Layered solid	Layered solid	Layered solid	Layered solid	Filled with air, non inflatable	Layered solid	Filled with air, non inflatable
Equipment	Ball	Circumference	18.5 centimeters	22.7–25.5 centimeters	8.5–9 inches (22–23 cm)	9–9.25 inches (22.9–23.5 cm)	11.875–12.125 inches (30.16–30.80 cm)	20.84 centimeters		21.6–22.2 centimetres (8.5–8.7 in)	7–7.5 inches (18–19 cm)	8.81–9 inches (22.4–22.9 cm)		20 centimeters	24 centimeters	19–21 centimeters
Equipment	Ball	Diameter	-	-	-	-	-	6.64 centimeters		-	-	-		-	8 centimeters	-
Equipment	Ball	Weight	75 grams	98–130 grams	4.5–5 ounces (130–140 g)	5–5.25 ounces (142–149 g)	6.25–7 ounces (177–198 g)	84,8 grams		160–165 grams (5.6–5.8 oz)	2.5–3 ounces (71–85 g)	5.5–5.75 ounces (156–163 g)		60 grams	140 grams	70–85 grams
Equipment	Ball	Pressure	-	-	-	-	-	7.99 kilograms-force (78.4 N; 17.6 lbf) (to press the ball into the center of inside by 30%)	-	-		-	-		-	-
Equipment	Ball	Bounce					0.47 e	0.76 meters (drop to marble floor from 1.5 meters in height)								
Equipment	Ball	Material	Cork (core), leather (case)	Leather (case)		cork or rubber (core); yarn; white horsehide or cowhide (case)	kapok, cork and rubber mixture or polyurethane mixture (core); yarn covered with latex or rubber cement; horsehide or cowhide (case)	Natural rubber	Plastic			cork (core); twine or string; leather (case)			livestock hair; leather (case)	red leather covered
Equipment	Bat	Length		70–110 centimeters	36 inches (91 cm)	42 inches (110 cm)	34 inches (86 cm)	None	30–38 inches (76–97 cm)	100 centimetres (39 in)	19 inches (48 cm)	38 inches (97 cm)	96.5 centimeters	60–110 centimeters	100 centimeters	-
Equipment	Bat	Diameter/width		7 centimeters	3.5 inches (8.9 cm)	2.25–2.625 inches (5.72–6.67 cm)	2.25 inches (5.7 cm)	None		5.6 centimetres (2.2 in)	4.25 inches (10.8 cm)	4.25 inches (10.8 cm)	10.8 centimeters	4.9–5.1 centimeters	5 centimeters	3 centimeters
Equipment	Bat	Weight					38 ounces (1,100 g)	None		580–650 grams (20–23 oz)				1450–1550 grams		
Equipment	Bat	Material	Wood, aluminum, plastic			Wood	Composite, aluminum	None	Wood	Glass fiber and carbon fiber	Wood	Wood		Wood	Wood	Wood
Equipment	Uniform	Non protective		shirts, blouses, shorts or trousers	Shirt, shorts, socks and footwear	Jersey, pants, shoes, cap, gloves	Jersey, pants, shoes, cap or visor (women), gloves	Jersey, pants, shoes		Jersey, pants, shoes, gloves, spikes	No spiked shoes allowed	Jersey, pants, shoes, cap	Jersey, pants, shoes	Baseball cap, numbered T-shirt , shorts , sports socks and shoes	Shirt, shorts, leggings and cap	No spiked shoes allowed
Equipment	Uniform	Protective gear	None	Helmet	Backstop: facemask, gloves	Skull cap, Batting helmet, helmet, chest protector, shin guards	Helmet, chest protector, shin guards	None		Helmet	Gloves: batters and wicket-keeper	Batter: helmet, leg guards (batting pads), batting gloves, forearm guards.; Fielder: helmet; Wicket-keeper: wicket-keeping pads, gloves.	Batter: batting gloves.; Wicket-keeper: wicket-keeping gloves.	None	None	None
Players	Number (Note: The minimum (or typical, if there is one) number of players per team on the field is shown.)		9		11	9		5	3-4	9-12	11	11	8	6	11	12
Players	Who bats		Batter		Batsman	Batter				Batter	Batter	Batsman or batter		Batter	Batter	Batter
Players	Who delivers		Bowler	Pitcher	Bowler	Pitcher		Batter	Pitcher	Pitcher	Bowler	Bowler		Pitcher	Pitcher (offensive team)	Batter
Players	Delivery receiving fielder			Catcher	Backstop	Catcher		None		None	Wicket-keeper	Wicket-keeper		None	None	None
Innings			2	5-7	2	9	7	5		4		4	1	Time limited (60 minutes)	1	Time limited (60 minutes)
Delivery	Allowed form		Underarm		Underarm	Overarm, sidearm and underarm	Only underarm	Batter has to hit ball attempting a bounce within fair territory	Overhand throwOverarm, sidearm and underarm	Vertically, 1 meter or more above batter	Underarm	Overarm and roundarm	Overarm, roundarm and underarm	Vertically, above service circle	Vertically, ball has to surpass penalty area	Batter has to hit ball within playing field
Delivery	Target area/object in order to get batter out		Below batter head and above batter knee	Over homebase, not lower than the batter knee nor higher than the batter shoulder	Below batter chin and above batter knee	Strike zone		None	Vertical circular strike target of 18 inches (46 cm) diameter behind home plate and 18 inches (46 cm) above ground	Circular strike plate of 60 centimetres (24 in) diameter and 3–5 centimetres (1.2–2.0 in) height, on home base	Wicket: Square of 1 foot (0.30 m) per side, 3.6 feet (1.1 m) above ground	Wickets		Service circle: 50 centimeters (diameter)	None	None
Getting out (elimination)	Methods		Stumping post, caught	Runner: Tagging runner or base while possessing the ball; Batter: catching batted ball in flight, fail to hit 3 good pitches	Runner: Tagged or plugged (Note: hitting runner with the ball); Batter: Caugth, not batting one of two good deliveries	Strikeout, fly out, tag out, force out		Fly out, tag out, force out	Strikeout, fly out, tag out, force out	Runner: force out; Batter: foul in third strike	Bowled, body before wicket, caught, run out, timed out, hitting the ball twice	Caught, bowl out, lbw, run out, stumped		Runner: plugging	Plugging runner in the return corridor	Runner: plugging
Getting out (elimination)	Eliminated players to change turn		9	3	11	3				3		10	-		-	1
Getting out (elimination)	Multiple in same play					Double and triple play						No				No
When catching batted ball in flight			Batter is out		Caught: batter is out	Fly out: batter is out, foul tip: strike		Fly out		Forces all runners to advance next base	Caught: batter is out	Caught: batter is out		1 point for fielding team	-	1 point for fielding team
Hitting out of bounds					-	Home run, if over fair zone; Foul ball, if over foul zone		Batter is out	Home run, if over fair zone; Foul ball, if over foul zone	Foul hit	6 runs	6 runs	Up to 6 runs		2 points if over between sidelines	1 point if into long-hitting field
Scoring	Forms		Rounder, half rounder, half penalty rounder	Run	Run, penalty runs, bye, extras	Run				Run and additional run	Run, extra runs	Run, extra	Run, extra, bonus runs	Run (2 points), catching batted ball in flight (1 point for fielding team)	Points (both offensive and fielding teams)	Offensive: run, point for batting to outfield; Fielding team: point for dimish offensive player, penalty point
Scoring	Safe havens to score run		4	4	1 (run for each post reached)	4			3	3, additional run reaching home base	Both batters touch the opposing safe haven	Both batters cross the opposing safe haven		2	-	Batter has to run to the touch posts and back to the batting crease
Tournaments	World championship		No	No	No, only England vs Wales	Yes			No	Yes	No	Yes		No	No	No
Tournaments	Olympic		No	No	No	Official: 1992-2008, 2020, 2028; Demonstration: 1900, 1912, 1924, 1936, 1956, 1964, 1984-1988	1996-2008, 2020, 2028	2026 (SYOG)	No	1952 (demonstration)	No	1900, 2028 (T20)	No	No	No	No
Tournaments	World Games		No	No	No	1981	Official: 1981–1985 and 2022–2025; Invitational: 2009–2013	No	No	1997 (invitational)	No	No		No	No	No
Tournaments	Professional leagues		No	No	No	Yes		No		Yes	No	Yes		No	No	No

== Attendances ==
The bat-and-ball sports clubs with an average home league attendance of at least 20,000 in the 2024–25 or 2025 season:

#	Club	Sport	Country	Average
1	Los Angeles Dodgers	Baseball	United States	49,536
2	Kolkata Knight Riders	Cricket	India	45,877
3	Gujarat Titans	Cricket	India	43,957
4	San Diego Padres	Baseball	United States	42,434
5	New York Yankees	Baseball	United States	42,408
6	Hanshin Tigers	Baseball	Japan	41,722
7	Philadelphia Phillies	Baseball	United States	41,672
8	New York Mets	Baseball	United States	39,775
9	Yomiuri Giants	Baseball	Japan	39,761
10	Perth Scorchers	Cricket	Australia	38,507
11	Fukuoka SoftBank Hawks	Baseball	Japan	38,281
12	Chennai Super Kings	Cricket	India	37,944
13	Chicago Cubs	Baseball	United States	37,259
14	San Francisco Giants	Baseball	United States	36,121
15	Atlanta Braves	Baseball	United States	35,841
16	Toronto Blue Jays	Baseball	Canada	35,184
17	Chunichi Dragons	Baseball	Japan	35,012
18	Lucknow Super Giants	Cricket	India	34,821
19	Royal Challengers Bengaluru	Cricket	India	34,566
20	Boston Red Sox	Baseball	United States	34,277
21	Houston Astros	Baseball	United States	33,677
22	SunRisers Hyderabad	Cricket	India	33,612
23	Yokohama DeNA BayStars	Baseball	Japan	33,245
24	Mumbai Indians	Cricket	India	32,988
25	Delhi Capitals	Cricket	India	32,739
26	Milwaukee Brewers	Baseball	United States	32,717
27	Los Angeles Angels	Baseball	United States	32,290
28	Hokkaido Nippon-Ham Fighters	Baseball	Japan	31,442
29	Seattle Mariners	Baseball	United States	31,333
30	Colorado Rockies	Baseball	United States	30,057
31	Adelaide Strikers	Cricket	Australia	28,593
32	ORIX Buffaloes	Baseball	Japan	28,571
33	Hiroshima Toyo Carp	Baseball	Japan	28,356
34	Tokyo Yakult Swallows	Baseball	Japan	27,944
35	St. Louis Cardinals	Baseball	United States	27,777
36	Rajasthan Royals	Cricket	India	27,651
37	Punjab Kings	Cricket	India	27,384
38	Cincinnati Reds	Baseball	United States	26,967
39	Brisbane Heat	Cricket	Australia	26,593
40	Sydney Sixers	Cricket	Australia	26,515
41	Chiba Lotte Marines	Baseball	Japan	26,018
42	Joburg Super Kings	Cricket	South Africa	25,436
43	Cleveland Guardians	Baseball	United States	25,325
44	Melbourne Stars	Cricket	Australia	24,401
45	Saitama Seibu Lions	Baseball	Japan	24,395
46	Washington Nationals	Baseball	United States	23,959
47	Tohoku Rakuten Golden Eagles	Baseball	Japan	23,713
48	Baltimore Orioles	Baseball	United States	22,545
49	Samsung Lions	Baseball	South Korea	22,312
50	LG Twins	Baseball	South Korea	22,260
51	Minnesota Twins	Baseball	United States	22,108
52	Kansas City Royals	Baseball	United States	21,860
53	Melbourne Renegades	Cricket	Australia	21,528
54	Lotte Giants	Baseball	South Korea	20,301

== See also ==
- Comparison of baseball and cricket, the two largest bat-and-ball sports
- Comparison of baseball and softball
- List of stick sports
- Tagging games with similar themes of safe areas and elimination:
  - Atya patya
  - Surr
