= Palant =

Polish stick-and-ball game

- Pictogram of palant
- First played: mid-1500s

Characteristics
- Team members: 3+
- Type: Team sport

Presence
- Country or region: Poland

Palant is a Polish bat-and-ball game, similar to American baseball, played by using a solid wooden bat and rubber balls. Similar games are German Schlagball, Russian lapta and Romanian oină.

== In the United States ==
In his book God's Playground, Norman Davies suggests that baseball may have developed from Palant as played by the first Polish immigrants, such as the Jamestown Polish craftsmen, who arrived in October 1608 on the emigrant ship Mary and Margaret, which brought the first Polish settlers into Jamestown, Virginia. According to Davies, those Polish artisans were said to be responsible for the continent's first industrial strike, and in the game of Palant, for the invention of Baseball.

However, many Native American people played a similar game well before the arrival in the Americas of European people, as recorded in Cherokee sources.

== Rules ==
Palant is a bat-and-ball game played between two teams of 7 to 15 players on a field 60 m long and 25 m wide. The bat, also called "palant," is a 60-cm-long wooden stick that can be round or flattened. The ball has a 5 to 7 cm diameter and is made of rubber. The field is divided into three zones: "heaven" past the line where the batting team starts; "hell," where the defending team is; and a neutral zone between the centre line and the heaven line which the defending team can't enter. The game is usually played over two halves.

The batting team is trying to maintain the heaven side for as long as possible. A batting player stands on the edge of the field (in heaven). They have to serve their own ball and hit it so it lands in the far half of the field (in hell). A batting player, after a successful hit, taps their palant stick on the heaven line and starts running, through the whole field, to the hell line and then back to the heaven line. They can stop at the centre line or the hell line and continue their run after the next batting player hits the ball. If the run is successful, the player earns one point and is allowed to bat again. If a batter misses the ball on their turn they can run along with the next batter to makes a hit but these player don't score a point when returning to the heaven line they are just allowed to bat again.

The defending team occupies the hell side and seeks to eliminate all the players on the heaven team, when all heaven players are eliminated, teams switch sides. A the current batter can be eliminated if: they forget to place their palant on the heaven line; a hell player catches the ball while it's still in the air; or if they are still running (not standing on the centre or hell line) when the ball, thrown by the defending team, crosses heaven line – if this happens play stops and any running players are not eliminated but return to the last line they crossed. Any heaven players running are eliminated if they are hit by the ball.

Each team has a "mother" – a privileged player with three attempts at batting.

When the game time ends, the team with the most points wins.

== Bibliography ==
- Redakcja Słowników Języka Polskiego PWN (1995). Słownik Wyrazów Obcych PWN wydanie nowe. Warsaw: Wydawnictwo Naukowe PWN. p. 811. ISBN 83-01-11487-8.
- Zespół Wydawnictwa Wilga (1998). Słownik Współczesnego Języka Polskiego tom 2. Warsaw: Przegląd Reader's Digest. p. 7. ISBN 83-909366-3-1.
- Kopaliński, Władysław (1989). Słownik wyrazów obcych i zwrotów obcojęzycznych. Warsaw: Wiedza Powszechna. p. 373. ISBN 83-214-0570-3.
