= Double diamond =

Double diamond may refer to:

- Double Diamond (album), 1973 release by British jazz-rock group If
- Double Diamond Baseball, a sport based on traditional baseball
- Double Diamond, a Double Black Diamond ski trail rating
- Double Diamond Burton Ale, a brand of beer brewed by Carlsberg UK
- Double Diamond International, a team golf tournament played in the 1970s
- Double Diamond Individual Championship, an individual golf tournament played in the 1970s
- Double diamond, a music recording sales certification
- Double Diamond, a pin-setter used in five-pin bowling
- Double Diamond (design process model) as described by the British Design Council
- A (mineral) diamond within another diamond
- The "Double Diamond", the name given to the logo of the English sportswear brand Umbro
