= Indian ball game =

Indian ball game may refer to:

- Indigenous North American stickball
- Indian Ball
- Kabaddi
- Traditional games of India
- Cricket in India
