= Matball =

Team sport

Matball, known in some areas as Big Base, is a sport, usually played indoors and sometimes outdoors. Matball is a safe haven game (sometimes termed a bat-and-ball game, despite the lack of a bat) similar to kickball, but with the key difference that bases are larger, often gym mats (giving the names "matball" and "big base"), and multiple runners can be on each base.

== Object ==
The object of Matball is similar to kickball in which there are two opposing teams, each trying to score by kicking the ball and then running the bases (represented by mats) successfully. The team with the most runs scored is the declared the winner.

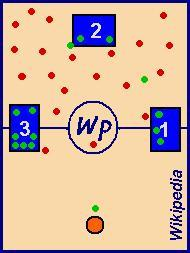
This is an example of a matball field while a game is in progress. Red denotes defense, while green denotes offense.

== Rules ==
Although rule details vary from site to site, and even from game to game, there are a few standard rules.

The game is similar to kickball, with one team kicking (sometimes called "batting" despite the lack of bats) and the other team fielding. The primary difference is that, rather than small bases intended for a single runner per base, large bases that can accommodate multiple runners are used, giving the game its names, "big base" or "matball" (when played indoors, in a gym, mats are often used for the bases). As a result of allowing multiple runners, usually unlimited, per base, there are usually no force-outs, although some variants limit the number of runners per base and allow force-outs. In some cases, a kicking team is retired after a set number of outs (often three or five), but in other cases outs are not counted, and play continues until all members of the kicking team have kicked, ensuring that everyone gets to participate. The number of innings varies, often changing even from game to game, to fit the game to an allotted time; when outs are not counted each inning is longer, and so fewer innings are played.

As in kickball, a ball is put in play when the pitcher rolls it to home base and the kicker kicks it into the designated field of play. The kicker must then run to at least first base. In most cases, when a player steps off a mat, sometimes just with one foot, that player must continue to the next base, though an exception is often made for an incoming runner whose momentum carries them a step or two beyond the base. Outs occur when a pop-fly is caught, the ball beats the runner to first base on the initial kick, a runner is touched by the ball while not on base, or runners do not tag-up after a pop-fly is caught.

Because there is no standard field of play, rules about fair and foul balls and home runs vary widely. Common variants include the following:

- A ball kicked behind home plate is a foul.
- A ball that hits the gym ceiling before travelling a certain distance forward is often a foul or an automatic out.
- Gym doors in front of home plate (in the fielding area) are sometimes left open, and a ball travelling through the doors may continue to be live, forcing the fielding team to retrieve it, or such a ball may be designated a home run.
- Hitting certain parts of the gym, such as balconies or upper levels, may be designated a home run.
- Hitting certain elements of the gym, such as a scoreboard or basketball backboard, may be designated a home run. In some cases a basketball backboard is in play, and only balls passing through the basket result in home runs.
- To avoid damage, hitting certain elements of the gym, such as a scoreboard, may be designated as an automatic out.

Common variants include the following:

- The pitcher may be a member of the kicking team rather than the fielding team, to ensure easy pitches to put the ball into play.
- Scoring a run often requires passing home base and safely reaching first base, or even making two full base circuits.
  - In such games, home base is often not a safe haven, and runners must tag home base and continue immediately to first base.
  - When two full circuits are required, runners passing home base are often required to grab a flag or rag, to make it clear which base runners are on their first circuit and which are on their second.
- Some schools use four bases in a square or rectangle, rather than the traditional softball diamond, with the kicker standing between the first and fourth bases.
- Instead of a catch counting as an out, it is sometimes counted as a point against the kicking team's score, decreasing the score, but many pop-fly catches are made.
- Instead of a home run, kicks to designated areas or beyond the field of play may result in one point for the kicking team and the advancement of all on-base runners to third base.
- Forward kicks that fail to travel a certain distance may be designated foul, to eliminate the need for a catcher and remove the option of bunting.
- Schools might also implement the rule of "No-catch outs", meaning a ball is not out if it is caught.
- Runners may be allowed to travel clockwise or counterclockwise, but once a runner starts they must continue in the same direction.
- Runners must reverse direction after touching home plate. Scoring requires a runner to touch all the bases going counterclockwise and then clockwise back to home base.
- Obstacles may be placed in the base paths.
- Runners might be required to complete a certain activity at each base, such as a specific exercise, before they can resume running.
- As each kicker puts the ball in play, a second player also begins a base run.
- The players can bunt a kicked ball like in volleyball until a certain defensive player (sometimes called an all-star) catches it. If the ball happens to touch the ground, the ball is still live.
