= Ice cricket =

Form of cricket played on ice

- Highest governing body: International Cricket Council
- First played: First half of the 19th century

Characteristics
- Contact: No
- Type: Skateless; Cricket; Team sport; Winter sport; Bat and ball game
- Equipment: red cricket ball made of a composite plastic

Presence
- Olympic: No
- Paralympic: No
- World Games: No

Ice cricket is a variant of the English summer game of cricket but played in harsh, wintry conditions. Early forms of ice cricket were played outdoors and on skates. The difference between the forms of ice cricket is that some are played directly on the ice, with no mat laid down. In modern forms the players don't wear skates.

In the modern game the ball is the same as an indoor cricket ball, a composite plastic red ball which makes it relatively easy to find if it gets hit into a snowdrift.

The Ice Cricket World Championship is held annually in the Estonian city of Tallinn. With winter temperatures of minus 10 to minus 25 degree Celsius, the tournaments are played on Harku Lake, which freezes over rapidly in early January.

== History ==
Cricket on ice was played in England from at least the first half of the 19th century.

A game was played in Sheffield in 1826. A match was played on the ice near Sheffield a few days ago, in skates, in which several of the Sheffield Club were engaged. Through one of the bats breaking the double wickets were struck, and the day was concluded with a well contested single wicket game.

Cricket Match Extraordinary.— The splendid piece of water on Erridge Park has been a grand scene of attraction for the last few weeks to the visitors and inhabitants of Tunbridge Wells. The surface covers an area of about twenty-one acres, and consequently gives a fine opportunity for scientific skating. We have noticed as many as from 100 to 200 at a time forming various figures on the ice. A cricket match was played on the ice by Messrs. E. Vanx, 33; J. Clapson, 1; T. Russell, 29; Duffy, 9, not out; A, Glover, 0; W.Loof, 1; J. J. Hastings and W. Friend; byes, 12; total 85; against —T.Neal, 14; J. Trice, 16; R. Clapson, 1; J. Taylor, 17; T.Seamer, 7; G.Bourne, 10, Beale.0; and J.Gurr, 12; byes, 17; total,84. The bowling of Mr. J. Clapson excited general admiration, as well as that of Messrs. Vaux and Seamer. The stumps were fixed in two blocks of wood, and all the gentlemen played in skates; the ball when struck flew with great swiftness over the ice, the parties running or rather skating between the wickets, and those who were looking out skating after the ball. The whole presented a most lively and interesting scene. The latter evolutions were attended with many of those minor accidents peculiar to the slippery game, much to the amusement of the numerous spectators; we are happy, however, to say that none were materially hurt. The game was a single innings. Mr. Vaux obtained thirty-three runs and was not out; his batting was very superior, as was also that of Mr. Thomas Neal. There were upwards of a hundred ladies and gentlemen on the ice at one time, among whom we noticed the Right Hon. Lord Viscount Nevile, Miss Myeta, &c. — Kentish Observer

An eleven-a-side game of ice cricket was played at Gosfield Lake near Halstead on 18th January 1838.

A twelve-a-side match of ice cricket was played in Chesham, Bucks in February 1841 between two teams of Gentlemen playing on the pond in the park.

An eight-a-side match of ice cricket was played in Oxford in 1850.

Cricket was also played on ice in the Fens, though it never became as popular as bandy. In February 1855 the Cambridge Chronicle reported on a match between March and Wisbech on the Ballast Pits at March. The home team beat the visitors by 118 runs, thanks to a century not out by Rhodes. "The fielding and batting of many of the players was considered to be far superior to and more graceful than any cricketing on the green sward".

WALTHAM ABBEY — Cricket Match on the Ice. A cricket match was played on the ice in the Waltham Marshes on Saturday, January 19, between the members of the Waltham Abbey and Enfield Lock Small Arms Factory Cricket Club and their friends, sides being chosen by Messrs. Dean and James — the whole of the players being on skates. The fielding by Messrs. Rutherford, Hawkins, Bigby, and Powell was much admired; but in consequence of the heavy fall of snow the day previous the scores were small.

A match was played on Chantry Water Mill Pond, Storrington in 1891 and another match was held near Market Harborough in 1893. In 1903 an ice cricket match was held on the English Skating rink at Davos.

A photo of a game of ice cricket in St Moritz was published in 1903. An international tournament called Cricket On Ice has been played on Lake St. Moritz since 1988 and now in Estonia every year since 2004.

British Olympic bobsledder, Keith Schellenberg is sometimes credited as having invented a form of ice cricket while in St Moritz. He is said to have taught the sport of cricket to fellow winter olympians while in Switzerland.

Another version credits the Estonian version to Barry Jason, an English immigrant to Estonia and former Estonian cricket president who was determined to increase the visibility of cricket throughout the year in the country. The first World Championship was held in 2007.

More recently in The Netherlands, the VOC Cricket club in Rotterdam has been known to organise cricket matches, in those winters when the lakes freeze sufficiently over to support such an event.
