= Elle (sport) =

Team sport

Sri Lanka elle
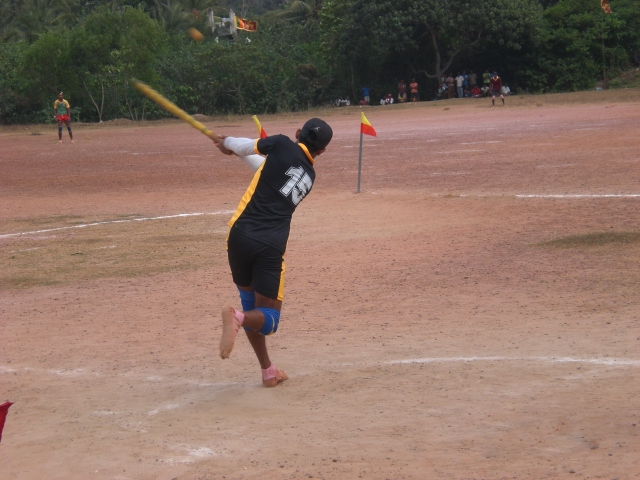
- Elle player hitting the ball
- Highest governing body: Association of Sri Lanka Elle
- First played: Sri Lanka

Characteristics
- Team members: Sixteen players and four substitutes
- Mixed-sex: Men and women elle team
- Equipment: Elle bat and ball
- Venue: Elle ground, paddy field or shore

Elle (එල්ලේ) is a popular bat-and-ball game in Sri Lanka which is also a localised name for slow-pitch softball, often played in rural villages and urban areas. Elle has the most similarities with softball.

== Introduction ==
Elle (එල්ලේ) is a popular traditional bat-and-ball sport native to Sri Lanka. Deeply rooted in rural culture and community life, it shares distinct similarities with modern slow-pitch softball and baseball. It is often played in open fields during festive seasons, such as after the paddy harvest and during the Sinhala and Tamil New Year. Equipment The Bat: A sturdy stick typically crafted from well-seasoned bamboo. The size and length can be customized based on the hitter's preference. The Ball: In modern times, a shaved or modified tennis ball (or light rubber ball) is used. Historically, players used the dried fruit of the Wel Kaduru tree. Game Play & Basic Rules Teams: The game is played between two teams, usually consisting of 12 to 16 players per side. It involves a pitcher, a hitter (striker), and fielders. Striking: The hitter stands at the striking spot and is given three chances to hit the underhand ball thrown by the pitcher. Running the Bases: Once the ball is hit, the hitter must sprint around a rectangular course that has four "stoppings" (bases) spaced roughly 55 meters apart. Scoring: If a player completes the entire circuit of four bases safely without getting out, it is counted as a "Run". The team with the most completed runs wins the match. How a Hitter Gets "Out" Catch out: A fielder catches the struck ball directly in the air before it hits the ground. Tag out: A fielder successfully throws and hits the runner's body with the ball while they are sprinting between the safe stoppings. Cultural Significance Known historically as the "poor man's game," Elle is a highly communal sport. It requires no expensive gear, brings entire villages together across all age groups, and builds high physical endurance, cardiovascular fitness, and team camaraderie.

== Rules ==
The game is played between two teams and the play scenario involves a hitter, a pitcher and fielders. The hitter is given three chances to hit the ball pitched at him or her. Once the hitter hits the ball with the bat – often a sturdy bamboo stick – the hitter has to complete a round or run which includes four possible "stoppings" spaced 55 metres (180 ft) apart. A strikeout happens if the hitter's ball is caught by the fielding side or if the fielding side is able to hit the hitter with the ball while he or she is in the course of completing a run. The hitter can stop only at one of the three stoppings in the round thereby paving the way for another member of his team to come and become the hitter. The side that gets the highest number of (complete) runs wins the match.

A team photograph of an elle team called Hendala Greyhounds, which dates back to 1911, depicts the team members after a game of elle, has been published. This indicates that the game may have been played by numerous organized groups from diverse areas. The fact that the players in the photograph were clad in European attire instead of sportswear indicates that the game might have been popular among the middle-class population of the era. The players are seen wearing neckties and suit coats. Existence of elle in and around the Hendala area as far back as 1900, is not accidental. It suggests that the game was an integral part of the lives of the people of such areas. It was deeply ingrained in their society which treated it as a powerful, attractive sport and was often played in a festive setting. In predominantly Christian areas, people used to organize a game of elle to coincide with the church feast which was invariably held on a Sunday.

== Equipment used in the past ==
Simple sturdy sticks made the early bat while the improvised ball was sometimes a dried fruit of Wel Kaduru (Cerbera manghas). After reaping the harvest from their paddy fields, farmers would gather together with their families by the now empty fields and play Elle to celebrate their break.

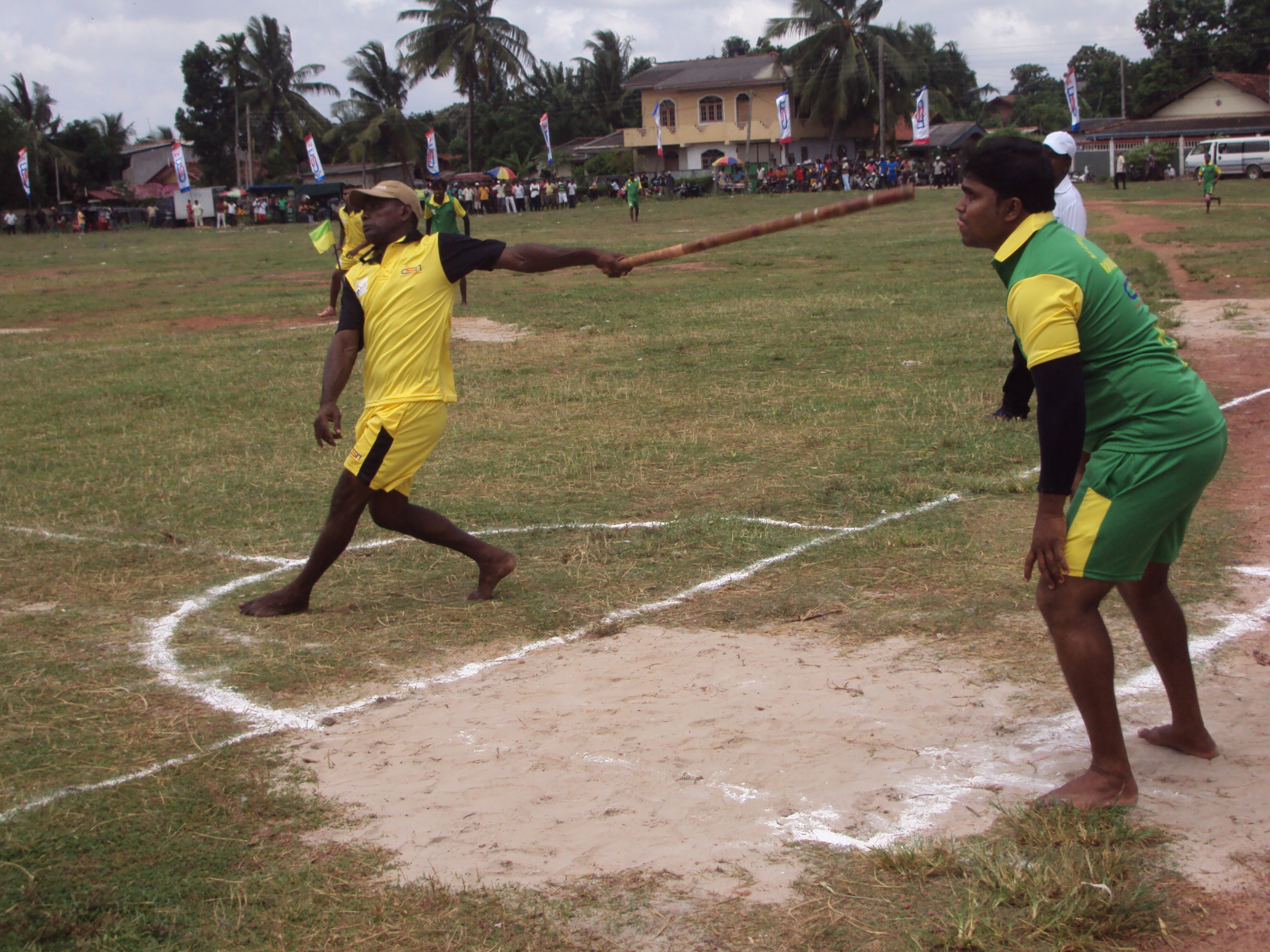

== The Elle culture in the past ==
In rural Sri Lankan villages, an elle game was a communal activity enjoyed by the whole village despite the age or gender. It is a time to enjoy, laugh and cheer on your loved ones and neighbours as the whole village would break into teams and play the game as a tournament. Elle would also be played as regional tournaments where teams representing adjacent villages or towns would battle to win the title of best elle team. This would gradually spread to national level championships played with good cheer.

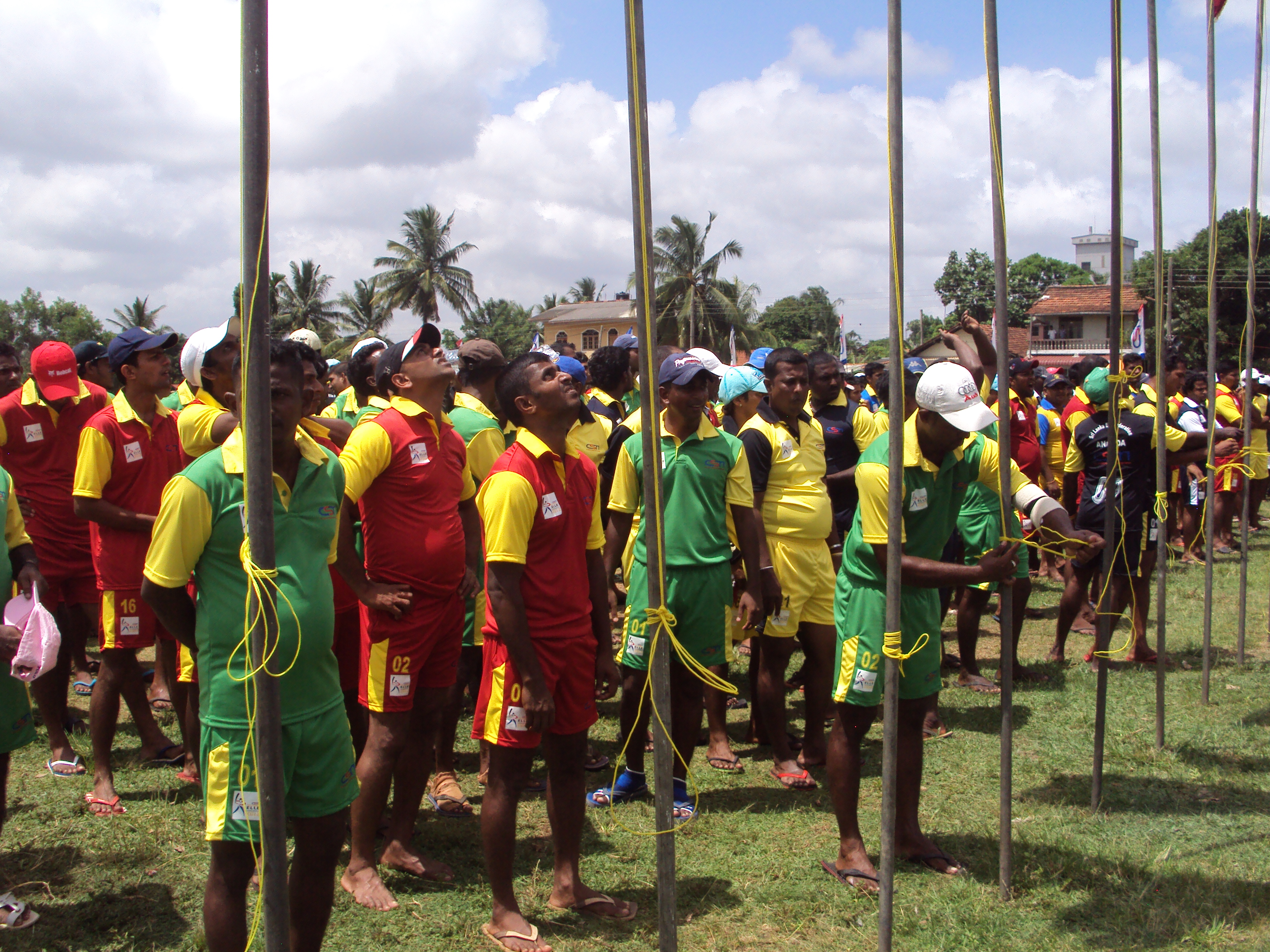
Players lined up for the national league

== Play ==
In a match, the maximum number of players in a team is sixteen with the minimum being twelve. The team with the lesser number would not usually call for the excess number of players to be removed from the opposing team. Instead, the additional players in the larger team could be included in the line up prior to the commencement of the third innings. Striking or fielding could be decided upon by the toss of a coin.

=== Elle ground ===
The playing area should be without obstructions especially to the running area. It should have an identical distance to the front and the two sides. The playing area should be marked with a line of 3 centimetres in breadth leaving at least five meters to the back of the striking spot.

Note: For matches played by school children the running distance between the bases would be less. Accordingly, for school matches the distance would be 11 m whereas for other matches arranged at sports society levels the distance would be 12 m.

=== Materials ===
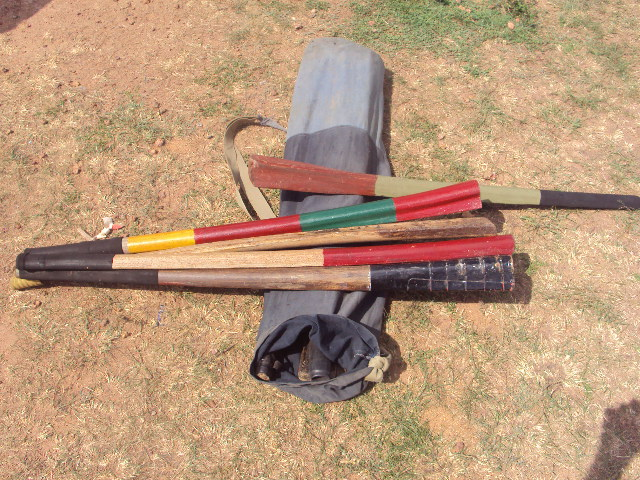
Elle bats

Equipment used in the playing area:

- Two posts ten meters in height similar to a bamboo tree, six posts two centimetres in breadth and one meter in height and eight flags to be tied to the end of the posts. (The height of posts from ground level should be 1 meter.)
- The elle bat should be made out from well-seasoned bamboo and the length and breadth of the bat can be in accordance with the requirements of the striker. Its circumference should not be changed under any circumstances. However, the elle bat could be bound with the material without using any metal in order to protect it from breaking or being damaged.
- Until such time as a special ball is specifically made for elle, tennis balls are used. The fur on the ball could be removed or shaved before use but removing of fur to make the rubber visible is strictly prohibited. A rubber ball or another light ball could be used instead of a tennis ball, but it is of paramount importance that the ball used should be common to both teams.
