= GAA rounders =

Irish team sport, form of bat and ball game

GAA Rounders Cluiche Corr
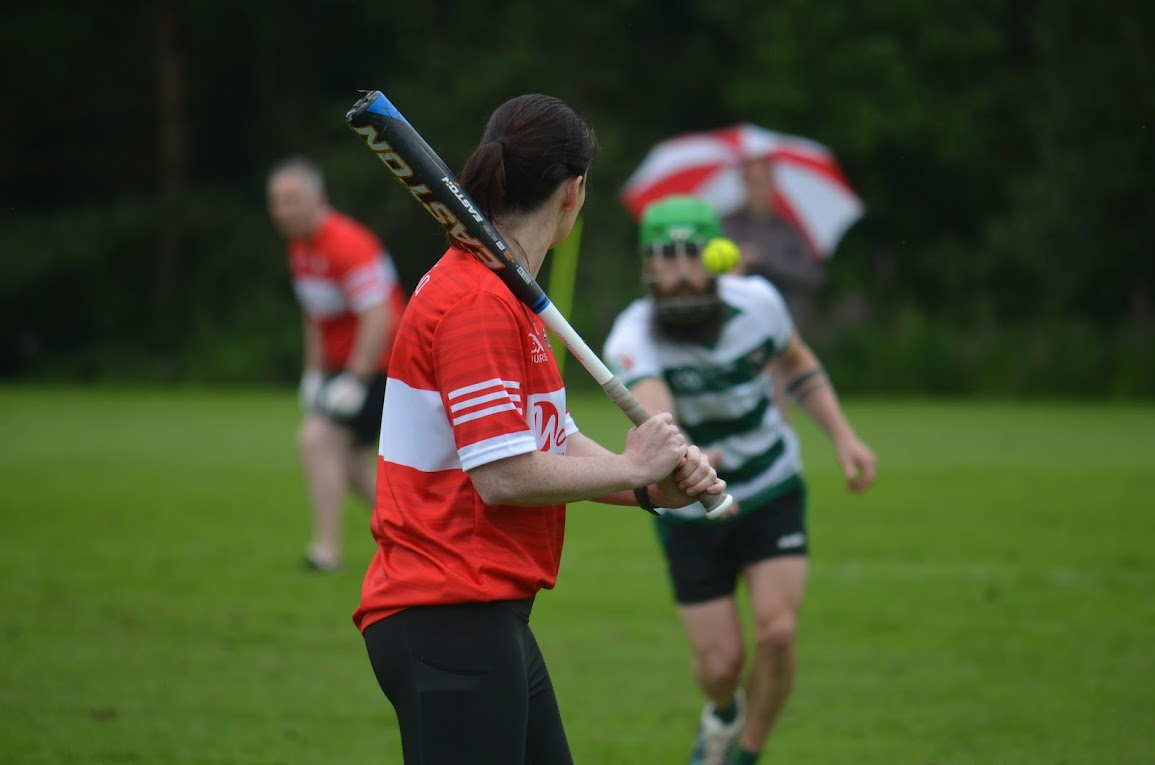
- A rounders batter prepares to hit a pitched ball
- Highest governing body: Gaelic Athletic Association (GAA)
- First played: 1958; 68 years ago
- Clubs: 61 (as of March 2024)

Characteristics
- Contact: No
- Mixed-sex: Yes
- Type: Outdoor
- Equipment: Sliotar
- Venue: Gaelic games field

GAA Rounders is a bat-and-ball game governed by the Gaelic Athletic Association. It is one of the four official GAA sports, alongside Gaelic football, hurling, and handball. The game shares similarities with other bat-and-ball sports such as baseball and softball. Another form of rounders is played in England.

== History ==
GAA Rounders was included in the original GAA charter in 1884, alongside Gaelic football, hurling, and handball. Despite this recognition, Rounders was not actively played in clubs for several decades, although its rules were documented in An Clár Oifigiúil (The Official Guide) of the GAA.

The earliest record of rounders being played is at the modern Tailteann Games. According to Peadar Ó Tuatáin, the former president of GAA Rounders, he was told that rounders was played in the Ballinascreen area in the early 1900s, and that this was played in preference to football or hurling.

In 1958, the Antrim club Erin's Own initiated the first formal rounders match under the rules outlined in the GAA Official Guide. This marked the beginning of the sport's revival. Over the next twelve years, Ó Tuatáin, then a member of Erin's Own, led efforts to promote rounders. His initiatives included the establishment of teams in the Air Corps in Baldonnel, County Dublin, and St. Joseph's Teacher Training College (now St Mary's) in Belfast.

== Organisation ==
The Ard Comhairle (AC) of GAA Rounders has up to 17 members responsible for overseeing the sport's operations. These members are elected annually at the AGM held in November. One member of the AC is appointed by the President of the GAA to serve as a liaison officer. The AC is tasked with organising competitions, promoting rounders, and advancing development efforts.

In an address to the Oireachtas in 2024, GAA Rounders president Iain Cheyne stated "GAA Rounders is set up like as a large county structure. As the organisation continues to grow, a move to provincial style structures will be required to ensure that the correct level of supports is afforded to all clubs."

Rounders organises All-Ireland championships at junior, intermediate and senior levels and has both single and mixed-sex teams.

== Playing rules ==
=== Pitch dimensions and set-up ===
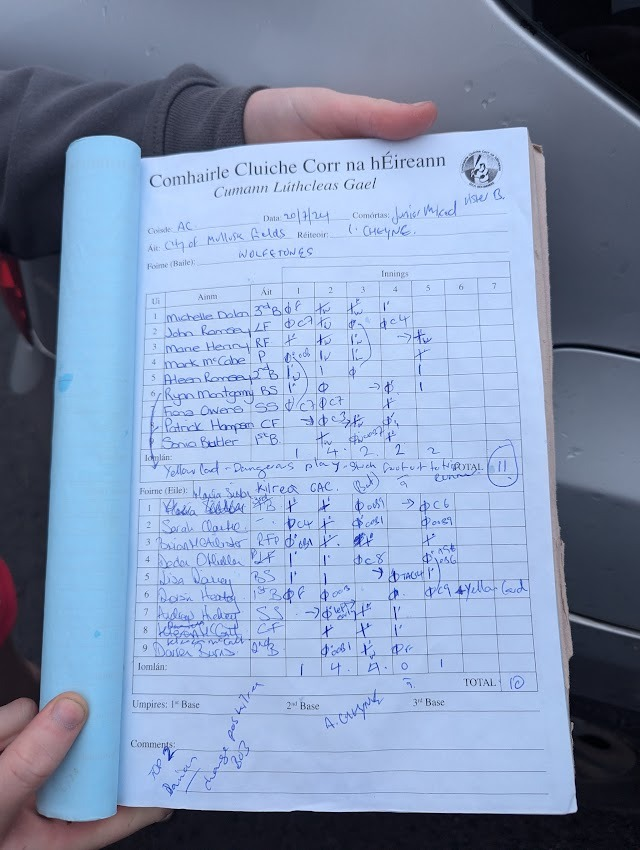
A GAA Rounders team sheet and scores from a 2024 All-Ireland Mixed Junior Championship game.

Rounders is played on a playing field of 70m x 70m with four bases 25m apart. Teams consist of a maximum of nine players, with up to five substitutions permitted. Before play begins, the referee organises a coin toss between captains to decide whether a team will bat or field first. A game consists of five innings (seven for All-Ireland Senior Championship semi-finals and finals). Each inning has two halves: one team bats while the other fields until three outs are made. The team with the most runs at the end of the game wins. If the scores are tied in a knockout match, extra innings are played. If still tied, the match may be replayed.

=== Pitching ===
The pitcher must deliver the ball underarm from the pitching mat, ensuring it passes over home base and stays between the batter’s knees and shoulders. Bad balls (those outside these limits) allow batters and runners to advance under certain conditions. If a pitcher deliberately delivers bad balls, penalties may be applied.

=== Batting and running ===
Batters must stand within the batter’s box and hit the ball forward into play. They get three good pitches to hit; failing to do so results in an out. Fouls or dangerous throws may result in warnings or dismissal. Runners advance by touching bases in order (1st, 2nd, 3rd, home). They may not deviate from the path to avoid being tagged. Runners must return to missed bases if signalled by the umpire. Only one runner may occupy a base at a time.

=== Fielding ===
Fielders may tag runners or bases with the ball to make an out. They must leave a clear path for runners and firmly hold the ball during tagging. If a struck ball is caught mid-air, the batter is out, but runners may advance at their own risk.

Play continues until the ball is dead or the umpire signals.
