= One-armed versus one-legged cricket =

A Greenwich pensioner with a wooden leg pictured in 1813

One-armed versus one-legged is a form of cricket in which one team has cricketers with only one arm while the members of the other team only have one leg.

There have been several matches of this sort, held for the annual benefit of the Greenwich pensioners – sailors pensioned off from the Royal Navy and resident at the Royal Hospital for Seamen at Greenwich. These sailors often lost limbs during naval service in the 18th century and so the teams were drawn from the ranks of the pensioners. In 1861, Charles Dickens reported a civilian match at Peckham Rye in his magazine, All the Year Round.

== Matches ==
The game at the Priory ground in Lewisham in 1848 was reported by the Illustrated London News which published this illustration showing the one-legged team at bat.

=== 1766 ===
In 1766, two teams of Greenwich pensioners played a match at Blackheath. The one-armed team beat the one-legged team quite handily.

=== 1796 ===
Two teams of Greenwich pensioners played at Aram's New Ground in Walworth for a prize of a thousand guineas. The match was advertised and so there was a large crowd of spectators. The teams arrived in three stagecoaches at 9 in the morning and play started at 10. The one-legged team batted first, scoring 93 runs in that innings. The one-armed team scored 42 runs in their first innings but there had been a great commotion while they were batting as a press of would-be spectators broke down a gate and some fencing to get in. Some climbed on top of a stable which collapsed so they were bruised. The one-legged team batted again and scored sixty more runs for the loss of six wickets. The game finished that evening with the one-legged team winning by 153 runs to 42.

There was a rematch on the following Wednesday. A one-legged batsman lost his wooden leg while making a run. The leg was fielded and thrown to stump him. This was a fine point of rules as the batsman's equipment had not disturbed the wicket while making the stroke but he was still given out. Notwithstanding this loss, the one-legged team won again by 103 runs.

The spectacle then concluded with a 100-yard dash in which the one-legged team raced for a prize pool of 20 guineas.

=== 1841 ===
Two teams of Greenwich pensioners played at Hall's ground in Camberwell.

=== 1848 ===
Two teams of Greenwich pensioners played at a ground formerly part of Lewisham Priory. The match was organised by Messrs Ingersoll and Stanton who managed to attract two thousand, four hundred spectators who were attracted by the novelty of the event. The game was played over two days and the teams were well-provisioned throughout, being given a hearty lunch before play and dinners of roast beef and lamb with plenty of strong ale at the Bull Inn. A band provided music for the occasion and the cricket players were additionally rewarded with a glass of grog and a fee of ten shillings. The one-legged men had difficulty connecting with the wide bowling, often being got out as they span around like a top. The one-armed team was the betting favourite and won the match, scoring 50 runs in their first innings and 41 in the second. The score of the one-legged team was 32 and 44, making the result 91 to 76 in favour of the one-armed team.

=== 1861 ===
The "Rosemary Branch" tavern in 1800.

Charles Dickens reported a match in his magazine, All the Year Round, having seen an advertisement in the window of a tobacconist. It was held at Peckham Rye in the grounds of the Rosemary Branch tavern, which hosted many sporting events and pastimes. The match was for the benefit of one of the one-armed men and the players were mostly locals but one was a well-known musical barber and dancer from Essex, who bowled for the one-legged team. Some spectators sat on benches but Dickens sat on the roller which was used to level the pitch. He described the spectacle as "painfully wonderful and ludicrously horrible":

The one-legged men were pretty well with the bat, but they were rather beaten when it came to fielding. There was a horrible Holbeinish fun about the way they stumped, trotted, and jolted after the ball. A converging rank of crutches and wooden legs tore down upon the ball from all sides; while the one-armed men, wagging their hooks and stumps, rushed madly from wicket to wicket, fast for a "oner", faster for "a twoer".
...
The one-armed men had a much less invalid and veteran air about them. There was a shapely lad in a pink Jersey, who, from having his hand off only at the wrist, merely looked at a distance like a stripling with his hand hidden by a long coat-cuff. But then, again, there was a thickset, sturdy fellow, in a blue cap, of the "one-leg" party, who, though he had lost one foot, seemed to run and walk almost as well as ordinary people. Then, again, on the "one-leg" side, there was an ostentatious amount of infirmity in the shape of one or two pale men with crutches, yet everybody appeared merry and good natured, and determined to enjoy the game to his heart's content; while every time a player made a run, before the dull beat of the bat had died away, there was a shout that made the Peckham welkin ring again, and all the crutches and wooden legs beat tattoos of pure joy and triumph. And when the musical and Terpsichorean barber rattled the wickets or made the balls fly, did not the very plates in the refreshment tent dance with pleasure!
...
Now, a lad who lost his leg when a baby, as a bystander told me, took up the bat and went in with calm self-reliance, and the game went forward with the usual concomitants. Now come the tips, the misses, the by-balls, the leg hits, the swinging blows that intend so much and do nothing, the echoing swashing cuts, the lost balls, the stumpings-out, the blocks, the slow treacherous balls, and the spinning, bruising roundhanders; not that our friends of the one leg and one arm swaddled themselves up in any timid paddings or bandages; they put on no india-rubber tubed gloves, no shelter-knuckles, they don no fluted leggings. What is a blow on the knuckles to a man who has lost a leg or an arm, who has felt the surgeon's saw and the keen double-edged knife? Yet all this time there was rather a ghastly reminder of suffering about the whole affair, to my mind. I could fancy the game played by out-patients in some outlying field of Guy's Hospital. I could believe it a party of convalescents in some field outside Sebastopol. Well, I suppose the fact is, that men don't think much of misfortunes when they are once irretrievable, and that these men felt a pleasure in doing an eccentric thing, in showing how bravely and easily they could overcome an infirmity that to some men appears terrible. After all, one thinks, after seeing such a game, one-legged and one-armed men are not so miserable as people imagine. Nature is kind to us in her compensations.

After much energetic play and incident, the one-armed team won by 14 runs.

=== 1863 ===
There was a match in Manchester where a player nicknamed "No-Legs" bowled for one team.

== See also ==
- Blind cricket
- Deaf cricket
