= Last man stands cricket =

Form of cricket

Last Man Stands cricket (LMS) is a form of cricket played with only 8 players per side. It originated in England in 2005. It is a 20-over (with each over lasting 5 balls) format where a pink ball is used.

== Rules and regulations ==
- Played with 8 players per side.
- The most distinguishing feature of this form of cricket is that if a team loses 7 wickets in an innings, the remaining batter continues to bat without a partner, instead of being stranded (according to the normal Laws of Cricket, a batter cannot bat without a partner). This "last man standing" can only score in even numbers of runs.
- A six on the last ball of the innings, is worth 12 runs, called a Home Run.
- If the striker is caught out, the ball is still live, and the non striker can also be run out at the bowlers end. This is called a double play.
- The non striker can also attempt to steal two runs on a catch,(as extras), by running two (to the strikers end and back), before the other team runs him out. Steals can't be done on the last ball of the innings.
- Batter retire on reaching 50 runs. A retired batsman can return to the crease after lower-order batsmen either retire or are out.

== World wide recognition ==
This form of cricket is most recognised due to the Last man stands feature which is contrary to the usual Laws of Cricket.
