= Schlagball =

German bat and ball game

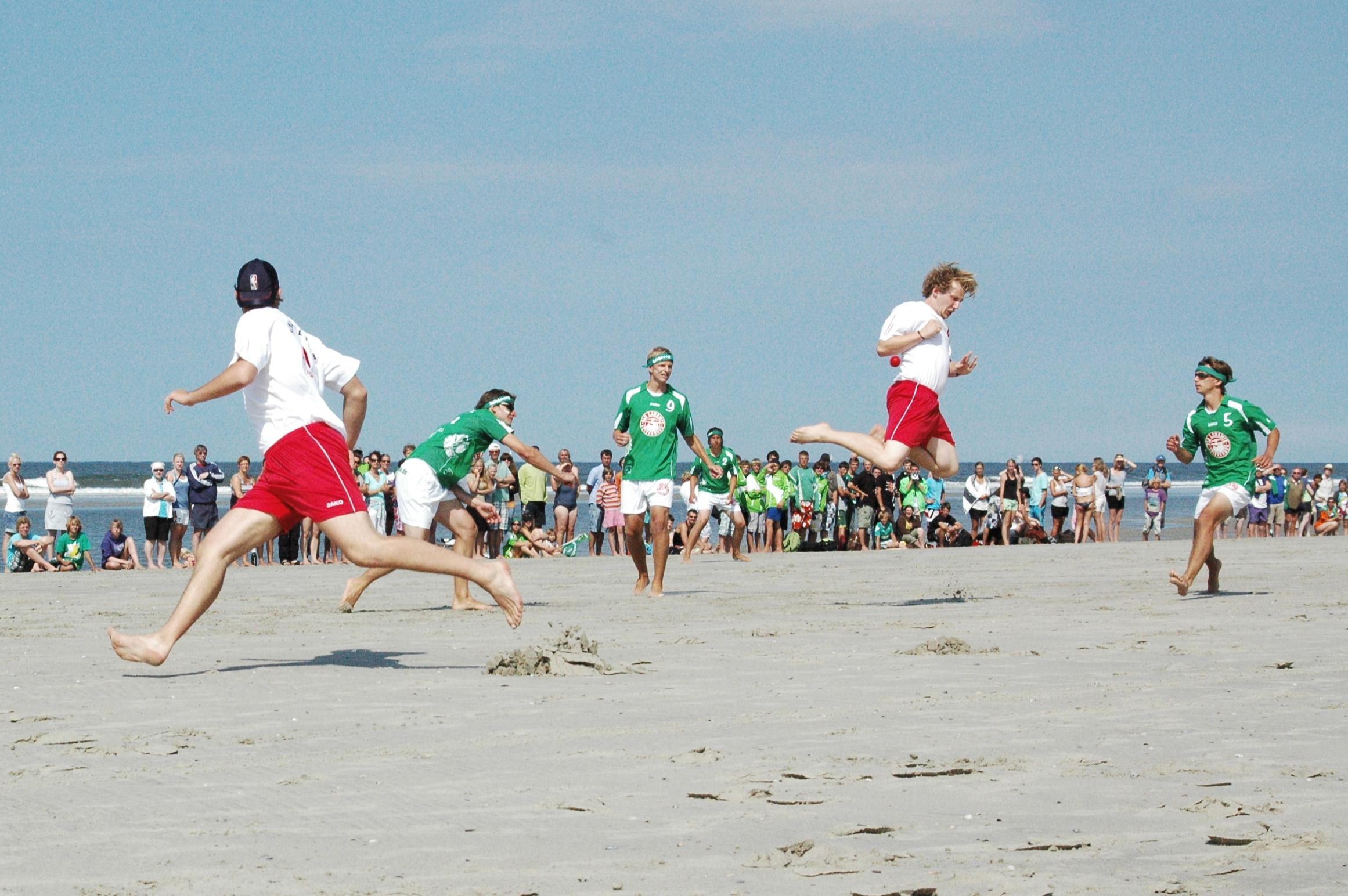

Schlagball (German: [ˈʃlaːkbal]) is a German bat-and-ball game that was popular up until the 1950s in Germany.

== Rules ==
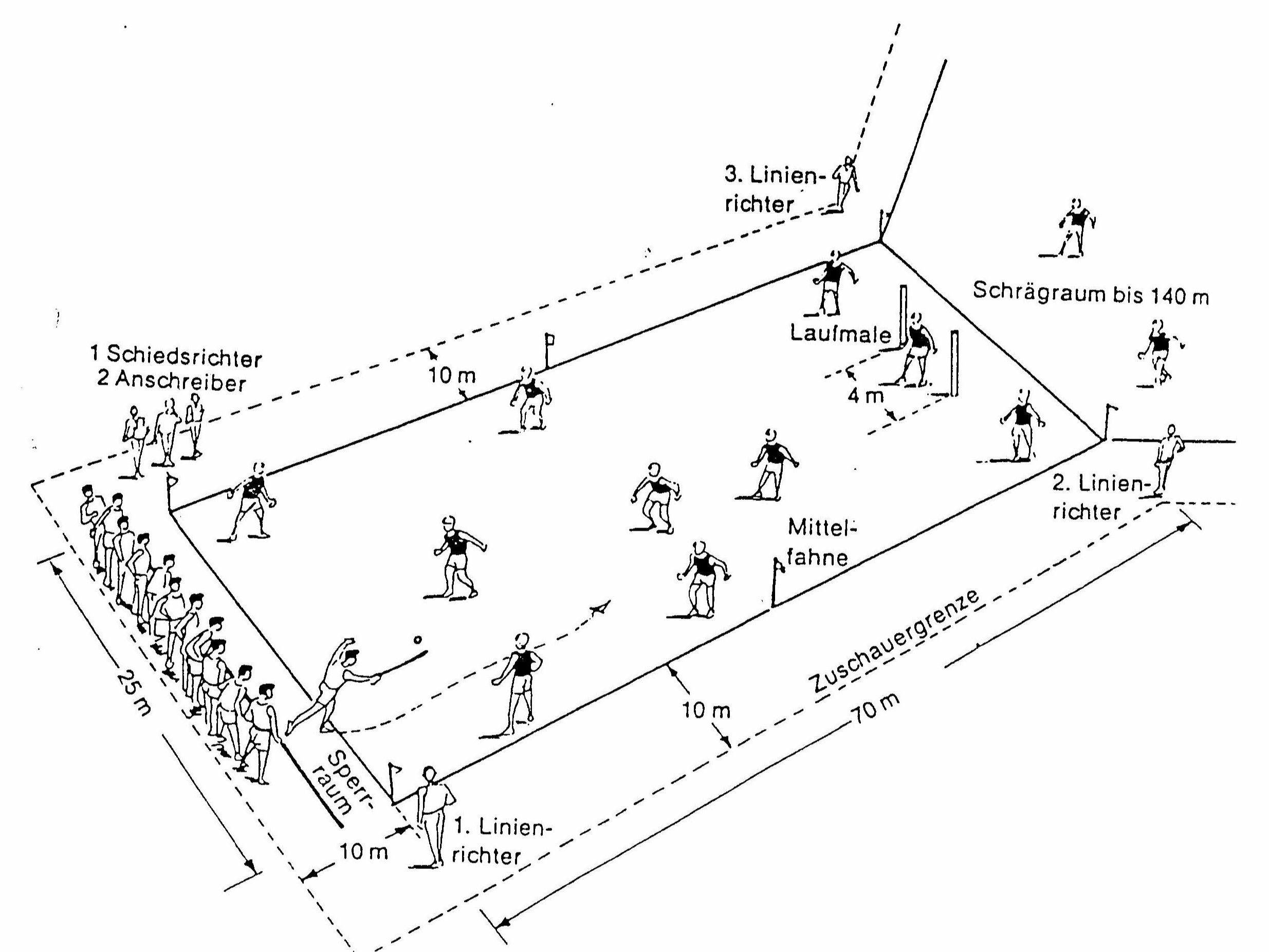

Two teams of 12 players contest the right to bat or field. The batting team tries to score by hitting the ball, which is thrown up by themselves, and running between the batting crease and two touch posts to score runs (unlike cricket, one must make a full trip back-and-forth to score a point, rather than simply going from one of the places to the other). The fielding team may end the batting team's inning by either throwing the ball at one of the batting team's runners (known as "plugging" or "soaking", as in early forms of baseball. This can't happen while a batter is batting, at the batting crease or at the touch posts) or catching the ball one-handed when it is hit in the air.

The batting team scores a point for each time one of their batters successfully runs, or one of their batters hits the ball into a "long-hitting field", which is about 70 meters away from the batting crease. The fielding team scores a point every time the batting team's inning ends (except when the fielding team has pushed one of the batting team's runners off of the field). The team with more points after an hour of play wins.
