= Kwik cricket =

High-speed version of the sport

Kwik cricket (known as Kanga cricket in Australia, and Kiwi cricket in New Zealand) is a high-speed version of cricket aimed mainly at encouraging children to take part in the sport, with an emphasis on participation and enjoyment.

== Rules ==
Many of the rules are adapted from cricket, but kwik cricket is played with a lightweight plastic bat and ball (for safety reasons), and plastic cones to mark the maximum width of a legally bowled ball. The rules can be altered so that virtually any number of children can play in the time available, and the game can be made easier or more difficult by changing the physical dimensions of the pitch (changing the width of the wickets, increasing the distance between the wickets, widening or narrowing the crease, pulling in or pushing out the boundary, etc.).

A base set of rules published for the Australian "Kanga Cricket" version in the 1980s was:

1. Batters bat in pairs. Each pair gets a certain number of overs or deliveries (often set at two or four overs per pair), no matter how many times they're out. There are no fours or sixes, batters have to keep running to add to their score.
2. Each bowler can only bowl a certain number of overs, so that just about everyone gets a bowl. There are six balls in an over. The ball can bounce more than once, and wides and no balls are not re-bowled.
3. When one side has finished batting, the total number of runs they have scored is divided by the number of times they've been given out to give the team score.
4. The team with the highest team score is the winner.
5. Each time a batter is out, batters change ends unless it happens to be the last ball of the over.
6. There is no Leg Before Wicket (LBW) dismissal.

== Observations ==
8-a-side is considered to be a good format to ensure that all participants get involved and have fun. This may also allow batters to face five or six overs per pair within a 60-minute game. An 8-a-side game also allows the fielding side a bowler, wicket-keeper and three fielders per side of the pitch. The UK's Scout Association sees the sport as an opportunity for young people to try out something new and to work together as a team.
