= Indian Ball =

Bat and ball game

Indian Ball is a "bat-and-ball" game featuring a baseball bat and ball. The sport originated in the late 1940s in St. Louis, Missouri so that if 18 players weren't available to play a regular baseball game, or a full sized field wasn't available, they could play an alternate game much like baseball but for fewer players.

== General rules ==
Indian Ball is played in any size area from a regular baseball field to a side yard or street. The game can be played with any number of players from normally 1 to ten. A ball may be put into play in one of three different ways. Pitched by a teammate, side tossed by a teammate or tossed by the batter themselves. If the ball is put in play and hits or is touched by the pitcher it is an automatic out. Only infielders can field balls in the infield and only outfielders are allowed to field balls in the outfield. If in any case an infielder plays a ball in the outfield or an outfielder plays a ball in the infield it is an automatic double (two points).

== Rules ==
3 strikes equals an out and 4 balls equals an out so that pace is sped up and the batter cannot wait around for a perfect pitch. A ball that is caught by a player in all locations (fair, foul or deadzone) without hitting the ground results in an out. If a ball is hit in play in the infield and an infielder (regardless if it was touched or deflected off them or someone else) before it comes to a complete stop results in an out.

If a ball is hit into or lands in the infield before the infielders get to it (regardless if it was touched or deflected of a player) results in a single (one point). A ball that is hit into the outfield (regardless of whether it is a grounder, line drive, or pop fly) but does not get behind an outfielder and is picked up by an outfielder before it comes to a stop (regardless of whether they or someone else touched it) it results in a single (1 Point). A ground ball that makes it into the outfield and is kept in front of an outfielder but is not picked up by the outfielder before it comes to a complete stop is a Double (2 Points). A fly ball that lands in the outfield in front of an outfielder and is not picked up by an outfielder before it comes to a stop (but does not get behind an outfielder) is a Double (2 Point). A ball that lands in front of an outfielder and then gets behind that outfielder (regardless of whether the outfielders touched it or not) and is not picked up before it comes to a stop equals a Triple (3 Points). A fly ball that lands in front of an outfielder and gets behind the outfielder and is not picked up by an outfielder before it comes to a stop is a Triple (3 Points). A fly ball that lands behind an outfielder (no matter the distance behind) without being touched by that outfielder and is not picked up before it comes to a stop is a Home Run (4 Points). Points that result in a negative result are when returning the ball back to the next batter, if the infielder who fielded the ball (when throwing from the spot where they fielded the ball) hits the bat with the ball the score of the batting team is reduced by one point (-1 Points). Another is When returning the ball back to the next batter, if the outfielder (when throwing from the spot where they fielded the ball) hits the bat with the ball the score of the batting team is reduced by two points (-2 Points).
