= Crocker (sport) =

Crocker (sometimes spelled Croccer) is a team sport played between two large teams. Its origins are in cricket and baseball. It also makes the use of a rugby ball, or a soccer ball which may explain its name. It is a casual sport not played formally, but often found on British summer camps.

== Rules ==
=== Teams ===
Crocker is played between two teams of undefined size, typically between 10 and 50 per side. The teams are not necessarily exactly even, though they are usually of similar size. Alternatively, a lack of skill on the side of one team may be made up for by a numerical advantage (for example in the case of many children playing against fewer adults).

=== The Field and Players ===
Crocker fields vary in size, but will often take advantage of whatever space is available. Often taking place on large, flat, grassy school fields, a crocker pitch may not have defined outer limits.

A generally agreed setup will involve a semicircular bowling and batting area usually marked out with cones. The batsman stands in the middle of the flat edge of the semicircle while the bowler stands opposite him on the curved edge. A wicket is set up behind the batsman, as in cricket, usually made of four cricket stumps set up to make a wider version of real cricket stumps or in another variation of the game a chair may be used as the wicket.

==== Fielding Team ====
Behind the stumps stands a fielding player, or sometimes two; this position is usually called the wicket-keeper. At either corner of the semicircle are two more stumps set up, between which the batsmen may run.

The rest of the fielding team stand anywhere in front of the batsman and outside the semicircle. The fielding team are not allowed inside the semicircle while the ball is being bowled, and at any time typically only six players are allowed on the edge of the semicircle. The rest of the fielding team tends to spread out to field and catch shots played by the batsman.

==== Batting Team ====
Apart from the batsman, none of the batting players are allowed on the field. Instead, they line up several metres behind the batsman to watch and prepare to bat. However some variations on the rules make use of the 'disrupting rule', whereby 5 members of the batting team are allowed to enter the field of play and disrupt the fielders as they try to recover the ball. The disrupters have to follow three clear rules. First, they must not touch the ball with their hands (unless they are inside the bowling/batting area and are permitted to use their hands to remove the ball from the semicircle.) Secondly there must be no physical contact between a disrupter and any member of the fielding team. And thirdly the disrupters may not interfere with the ball when it is on its way back to the bowler.

==== Umpire ====
If an umpire is present, they will usually stand at one of the corners. Their role is to count the runs and to uphold the rules and make decisions during the game.

=== Equipment ===
Any equipment is often made up of things that are to hand, but usually they consist of a football-sized ball, though a softer ball may often be used to prevent injury (for example, a volleyball). Sometimes even a rugby ball is used.

The batsman's bat is usually a baseball bat, or a rounders bat, although cricket bats have been known to be used. Some camps have also used more unconventional techniques, such as a pickaxe handle.

=== Play ===
During play, the bowler will bowl the ball, trying to hit the stumps. Unlike cricket, the bowler can bowl continuously, as soon as the bowler receives the ball, whether the batsman is in position or not. The following rules apply to a ball bowled by the bowler at the batsman:

- The ball must bounce in front of the batsman before he hits it.
  - If the ball does not bounce, and the batsman hits it, it is declared a "Full toss" by the umpire and the batsman cannot be out.
  - If the ball does not bounce, and the batsman fails to hit it, and the ball hits the stumps, the batsman is not out.
  - If the ball does not bounce, and the batsman fails to hit it, and the ball does not hit the stumps, no special call is made.
- If the ball strikes the batsman on the leg or other part of body on the way to the stumps, without first hitting the bat, a "Leg Before Wicket" (LBW) call is made by the umpire and the batsman is declared to be "half out". Unlike in cricket, the LBW call often does not depend on whether the ball would have hit the stumps if it had not been hit.
- Batsmen hitting the ball must run. A run counts if the batsman taps one of the stumps with his bat and runs back to his batting position. Some rule sets stipulate that the batsman must run around the stump. By convention, but not usually by rule, the batsman alternates between runs to the left and right.
- Batsmen play until out (see below).

The bowler and the six fielders on the edge of the semicircle are rotated at regular intervals (10 to 30 balls bowled).

=== Methods of Dismissal ===
A batsman can be dismissed in a variety of ways. The usual rules of crocker include the following:

- The batsman may be bowled if the "bail" is knocked off the stumps, either by the ball or by the batsman.
- The batsman may be caught if he or she hits the ball and, without touching the ground, it is caught by a fielding player.
- The batsman may be out Leg Before Wicket if he is given half-out for LBW twice.

There are also often various other methods of dismissal for crocker batsman, especially relating to sportsmanship. Loosely connected to this is being retired, which is to be taken from batting, usually either on reaching a certain score or batting for a certain time.

Crocker is unique in the rotation between batsmen. As soon as one is out, the bowler may immediately bowl another ball, if he or she has the ball, even if the next batsman is not ready and in position, then he or she is given out if out in any of the above ways. This is most likely to do with the length of the game; with the potential for over 100 batsmen in a match the emphasis is on speed and participation of everyone.

=== Winning the Game ===
Crocker is won by the team who, at the end of the match, has more runs. The runs are counted by the umpire.

== Special rules ==
Special rules of crocker are often employed. The most common of these are:

- A batsman may not be out on their first time attending the camp or other event at which crocker is played.
- A batsman may not be out to a ball that is bowled too fast. This is often a point of controversy, but the decision usually rests with the umpire and is to make the game more playable.
- A batsman may bat on behalf of his or her spouse, if the spouse is not available.
- A batsman may not take a large step towards the bowled ball, so as to cause a full toss artificially.
- If the batsman hits the ball behind the wickets only one run may be obtained, this rule stops people batting towards buildings etc.

== Tactics ==
There is not much scope for tactics in crocker, but there are some that can be employed more by individuals than as a team.

- The large number of fielders means that they will often get in one another's way. Also, they will often tend to clump together to talk as the ball may not come to them for a while. Therefore, some individuals who have greater fielding skills may disperse themselves throughout the field.
- A favoured batting tactic is for the batsman to tap the ball. Since the fielders are not allowed in the semicircle while the ball is being bowled, they have to run in every time that happens, and this gives time for the batsman to make a run. However, the ball usually returns to the bowler quickly, and therefore the batsman will find himself or herself having to continually run, and will often be tired out quickly.
- Some fielding placement is possible. The wicketkeeper should position himself or herself carefully, while a fielder square on either side of the batsman will receive more than average balls their way.
- A typical batsman's shot will be one that goes straight into the ground, so as to prevent a catch, but so that it bounces and has to be fielded in the outfield. This is particularly important if you have a game with large sides, as there will be no gaps in the field for you to aim at if you hit it in the air.

Alternatively

If caught out a player is only half out. If a player performs a "double hit" then they are one third out. If the amount to which a player is out is greater than 1 then they are fully out. A player is still fully out straight away if they are bowled out (except on their first hit).
