= Oină =

Romanian traditional sport

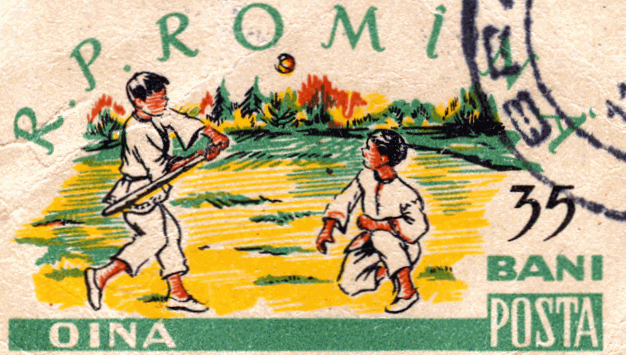
- Highest governing body: Romanian Oină Federation
- First played: 1364 (first documented); 1899 (modern rules)

Characteristics
- Contact: Yes, players are hit with the ball, but no body contact
- Team members: 11 per side
- Type: Outdoor
- Equipment: Oină ball
- Venue: Oină pitch

Presence
- Olympic: no

Oină (Romanian pronunciation: [ˈoj.nə]) is a Romanian traditional bat-and-ball game, similar in many ways to baseball.

== History ==
The name "oină" was originally "hoina", and is derived from the Cuman word oyn "game" (a cognate of the Turkish oyun).

The oldest direct mention comes from a diet manual of 1782 by medic István Mátyus, who talks about the health benefits of oina. However, it may have been attested as early as in 1364, during the reign of Vladislav, the Wallachian voivode.

In 1899, Spiru Haret, the Romanian minister of education, decided that oină was to be played in schools in physical education classes. He organized the first annual oină competitions.

The Romanian Oină Federation (Federația Română de Oină) was founded in 1932 and was reactivated at the beginning of the 1950s, after a brief period when it was dissolved.

Today, there are two oină federations: one in Bucharest, Romania and another one in Chișinău, Moldova.

In recent years, the Romanian Oină Federation has launched a wide campaign to revive the sport. Most of the traditional centres have been restored, and new areas have also been incorporated, so oină is practiced in more than 40 regions as of 2014.

In addition to spreading oină in the regions of Romania, the Romanian Oină Federation actively popularises the game outside the country, organising demonstration tournaments in different countries (Serbia, Japan, Indonesia, England, Poland, Germany, India, Pakistan, Croatia, Ukraine). For internationalisation, the Federation establishes partnerships with institutions outside the country (as it was in Ukraine, India, Pakistan and England) or with people who want to help popularise the sport. In cooperation with these people and institutions, the FRO creates study guides and handbooks on oină in various foreign languages.

== Pitch ==
Oină pitch animation

The pitch is a rectangle, 70 metres (230 ft) long by 32 metres (105 ft) wide divided into:

- the in game ("în joc") area, which is 60 by 32 metres (197 ft × 105 ft)
- the batting zone ("zona de bătaie") – 5 metres (16 ft) long – delimited from the in game area by the batting line
- the back zone ("zona de fund") – a 5 metres (16 ft) long safe zone during a run – delimited from the in game area by the back line

The attacking side player that has commenced a run will have to cross the following four lines in order:

- the start line (the left side of the batting line)
- the arrival line (the left side of the back line)
- the return line (the right side of the back line)
- the escape line (the right side of the batting line)

The in-game area is further split into the advance and return triangles and squares. At the intersection of the lines inside the game area and the pitch limits or other lines within the game area, there are circles which determine the positions of the midfielders ("mijlocași") and side players ("mărginași"). The 1m and 3m semicircles are used for batting and serving. A waiting line is drawn for attacking players to wait their turn to bat.

== Players ==
There are two teams of 11 players, one attacking side or "at bat" ("la bătaie") and one defending side or "at catch" ("la prindere"). The roles switch at half time.

The defending players are placed in the following positions:

- 3 midfielders ("mijlocași")
- 3 advance side players ("mărginași de ducere")
- 3 return side players ("mărginași de întoarcere")
- 1 back player ("fundaș") that is free to move within the back zone
- 1 forward player ("fruntaș") that is free to move within the batting zone

The attacking players change roles as the game progresses. The roles are chronologically ordered this way:

- waiting one's turn
- serving the ball
- batting
- waiting to enter the game (make a run)
- running the advance corridor
- staying in the back zone
- running the return corridor

Each team has a captain ("căpitan" or "baci"). The second midfielder is usually used as captain because they can throw the ball at an attacking player in any game position. For this reason, the second midfielder is also known as a baci.

Each team has a maximum of 5 substitutes available.

== Scope of the game ==
The teams have very different roles depending on whether they are at bat or at catch. At bat players are tasked to open a play and run the lanes until they cross the escape line. At catch players are tasked to hit the players running the lanes with the ball. There can be a maximum of two players running each lane at the same time. A player can be hit in both lanes once.

== Rules ==
The team at bat is selected by a ritual where the players have to grab the bat, thrown by the referee, and the last one to be able to place at least four fingers on the bat wins. The game begins with the team at bat, with one of the players throwing the ball while another player of the same team has to hit it with a wooden bat ("bâtă") and send it as far as he can towards the adversary field. After that, if the ball is caught by the adversaries, the player can run (if he wishes, or if he is forced to run by the referee) the advance and return corridors/lanes ("culoarele de ducere și întoarcere"), without being hit by the defenders. If he stops the ball with his palm, it is not considered a hit. The player is not allowed to catch the ball, and he must release it immediately. If the player doing a run is hit he goes out of field and into the back zone, or he finishes his tasks, depending on which lane he is running.

The full set of regulations can be found here.

== Scoring ==
=== In game ===
At catch players score two points for each player hit with a ball, unless the ball touches the palm or the back of the palm.

At bat players score by batting beyond certain lines, like so:

- the ball crosses the 65m line in the air and does not go out of bounds (does not cross the lateral lines), whether or not the defense touches the ball in the air – 2 points
- the ball falls in the back zone – 2 points
- the ball is touched in the air by the defense, and goes out of bounds in the air from within the back zone – 2 points
- the ball goes out of bounds in the air from within the back zone without being touched by the defense – 1 point
- the ball crosses the 60m line (the back line) in the air and is caught by the defense – 1 point
- the ball crosses the threequarters line in the air and falls in the threequarters area – 1 point
- the ball goes out of bounds in the air from within the threequarters area – 1 point
- the ball is diverted out of bounds in the air from within the threequarters area by the defense – 1 point
- the ball falls on the threequarters area of the back line – 1 point
- the ball is diverted from within the threequarters area in front of the threequarters line by the defense and is not subsequently caught in the air – 1 point

=== Competition ===
Winning brings the team 3 points, a draw brings in 2 points, and the losing team will score 1 point. Quitting or elimination of the team will result in no points being awarded and a 0–9 loss. Running out of substitutes due to injuries will result in a 0–6 loss and 1 point being awarded, while if the same situation is due to the elimination of a player, the result will be a 0–9 loss and no points being awarded.

== Ball ==
A spherical ball made of leather, filled with horse, pig, or bovine hair is used in oină. The ball is around 8 centimetres (3.1 in) in diameter and 140 grams (4.9 oz) in senior games and around 7 centimetres (2.8 in) in diameter and 100 grams (3.5 oz) in U-18 games.

== Comparison with baseball ==
- Similar mass of the ball: around 140 grams (4.9 oz) for both
- Longer and slimmer bat for oină
- A game takes only 30 minutes for oină
- Oină teams have 11 players, baseball teams have 9 players
- In oină, the defense can score by hitting the attacking players that are in game (running the lanes)

== Competitions in Romania ==
All competitions are organized by the governing body, the Romanian Oină Federation (Federația Română de Oină – FRO).

The main competitions are:

- The National Championship
- The Romanian Cup
- The Romanian Supercup
- The National Junior Championship

Other competitions in 2010 are:

- "Dragu" Cup
- "Gherăești" Cup
- "Antena Satelor" National Championship (junior)
- Federation Cup
- Border Police Cup
- "Monteoru" Cup
- "Cleopatra" Cup (beach oină)
- "Zarandului" Cup
- "Tătaru" Cup
- Village Cup
- "Antena Satelor" Cup
- various other junior and indoor oină competitions

A number of international events are organised:

- "Cronos" Cup (junior)
- International Festival of Sports Related to Oină
- Oină-Lapta Tournament

== Internationalising Oină ==
Oină and variants of the sport are also played in neighbouring countries where there has been or still is a Romanian ethnic or cultural presence. As part of its program to bring oină to the spotlight again, the FRO has begun the process of creating an international federation. A minimum of three national federations need to exist in order to form an international federation, and two exist already (the Romanian and Moldovan federations). The FRO has begun talks of founding oină clubs and federations in neighboring Bulgaria and Serbia, and in Sweden. Demonstration matches are to be held in Serbia.

== See also ==
- Baseball – Bat-and-ball game
- Sport in Romania
