= Extreme Baseball =

Variation of the sport baseball

Extreme Baseball, also known as Double Diamond Baseball, is a sport based on traditional baseball. The main difference is that both teams are on the field at the same time. Pitchers from each team take turns pitching to batters at two adjacent home plates. One team runs around the bases in the normal counterclockwise direction, while the other team runs around bases in a clockwise direction. The world premier game took place on May 5, 2007 at Historic Sanford Memorial Stadium in Sanford, Florida.

Extreme Baseball was conceived and developed by Phillip Weidner. In 2006, Weidner applied for a United States patent on the extreme baseball concept and the patent was approved in February, 2010. Extreme Baseball teams from Saint Petersburg, Florida, Orlando, Florida, and Miami, Florida were competing as of 2007 in the National Xtreme Baseball League. ON JUNE 13, 2008 Dannier Reyes of the National Xtreme Baseball League's Orlando Dragons made NXBL History by hitting the 1st Double Duel Semi "Grand" Slam. A Semi Grand Slam occurs in Xtreme Baseball Double Duel Mode when the bases are full on one diamond and with two base runners on the other diamond. It was just one base runner short of a Mega Grand Slam which occurs when both diamonds are full. The league ceased operations sometime during or after 2011; the league's website includes schedules up to 2011, but as of 2021 the website's front page features the statement, "The league is currently for sale and has ceased operations until a new owner is obtained."
