= Western sports =

Sports associated with Western culture

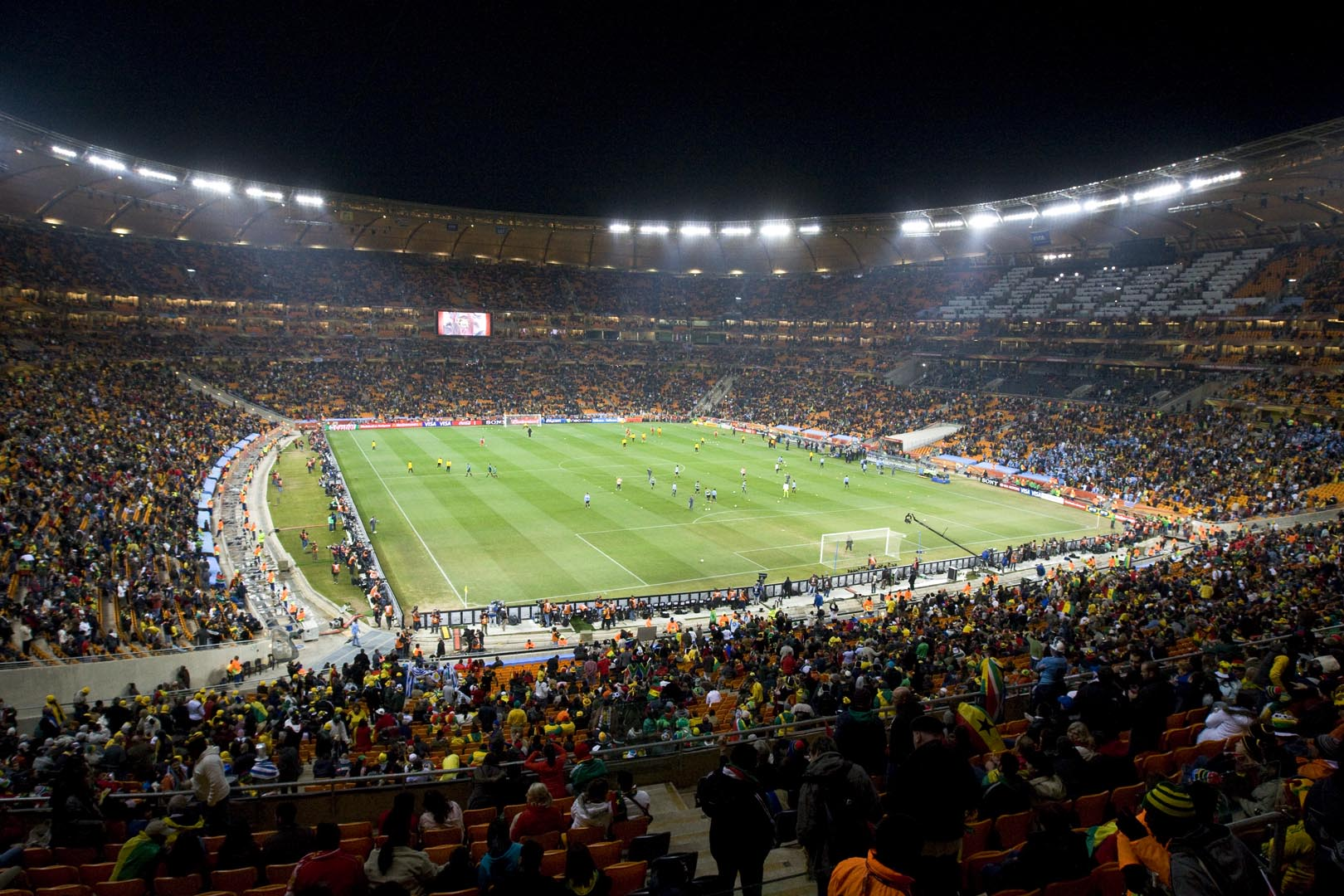
A depiction of the FIFA World Cup, the most popular sporting event in the world

Western sports are sports that are strongly associated with the West. (Note: Either because they were invented in a Western country, were played in the West for centuries, or were primarily spread around the world by the West.) Many modern sports were invented in or standardized by Western countries; in particular, many major sports were invented in the United Kingdom after the Industrial Revolution, and later, America invented some major sports such as basketball and baseball.

Western European colonialism and American influence were the initial causes of the spread of Western sports around the world. Later, globalization and the prominent role of Western sports in the Olympic Games helped further grow Western sports. The most-watched international sporting event is the FIFA World Cup, which showcases the Western sport of football (also known as soccer).

== History ==
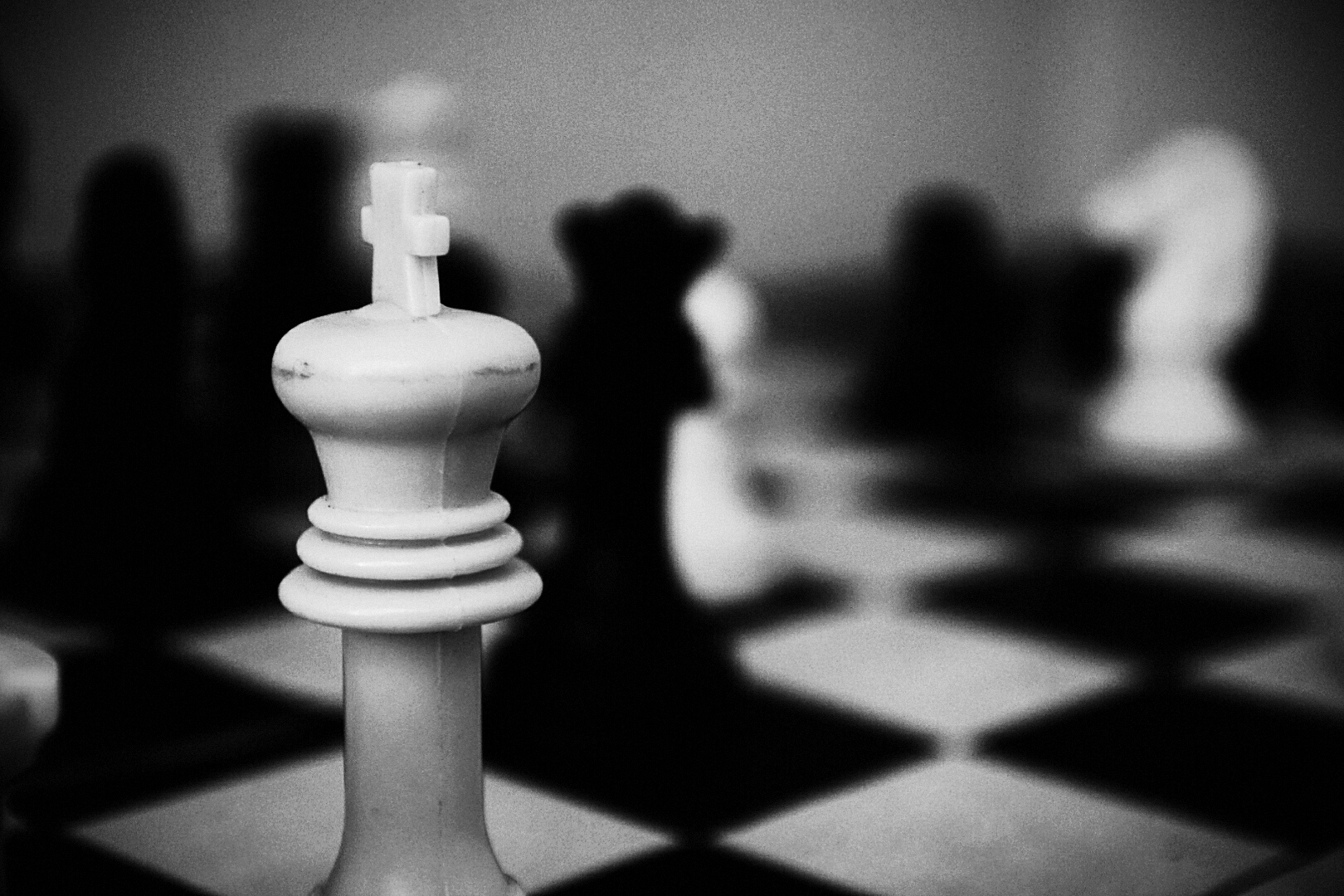
A depiction of the king in chess, the central playing piece. Chess was transmitted to Europe from India, undergoing various modifications along the way, and today is one of the most well-known Western board games.

Various minor games and board games were transmitted between the West and the rest of the world in antiquity. Chess originated in India as chaturanga.

=== Antiquity ===
The Romans built immense structures such as the amphitheatres to house their festivals of sport. The Romans exhibited a passion for blood sports, such as the infamous Gladiatorial battles that pitted contestants against one another in a fight to the death. The Olympic Games revived many of the sports of classical antiquity—such as Greco-Roman wrestling, discus and javelin. The sport of bullfighting is a traditional spectacle of Spain, Portugal, southern France, and some Latin American countries. It traces its roots to prehistoric bull worship and sacrifice and is often linked to Rome, where many human-versus-animal events were held. Bullfighting spread from Spain to its American colonies, and in the 19th century to France, where it developed into a distinctive form in its own right.

=== Middle Ages ===
Jousting and hunting were popular sports in the European Middle Ages, and the aristocratic classes developed passions for leisure activities. A great number of popular global sports were first developed or codified in Europe. The modern game of golf originated in Scotland, where the first written record of golf is James II's banning of the game in 1457, as an unwelcome distraction to learning archery.

=== Colonial era ===
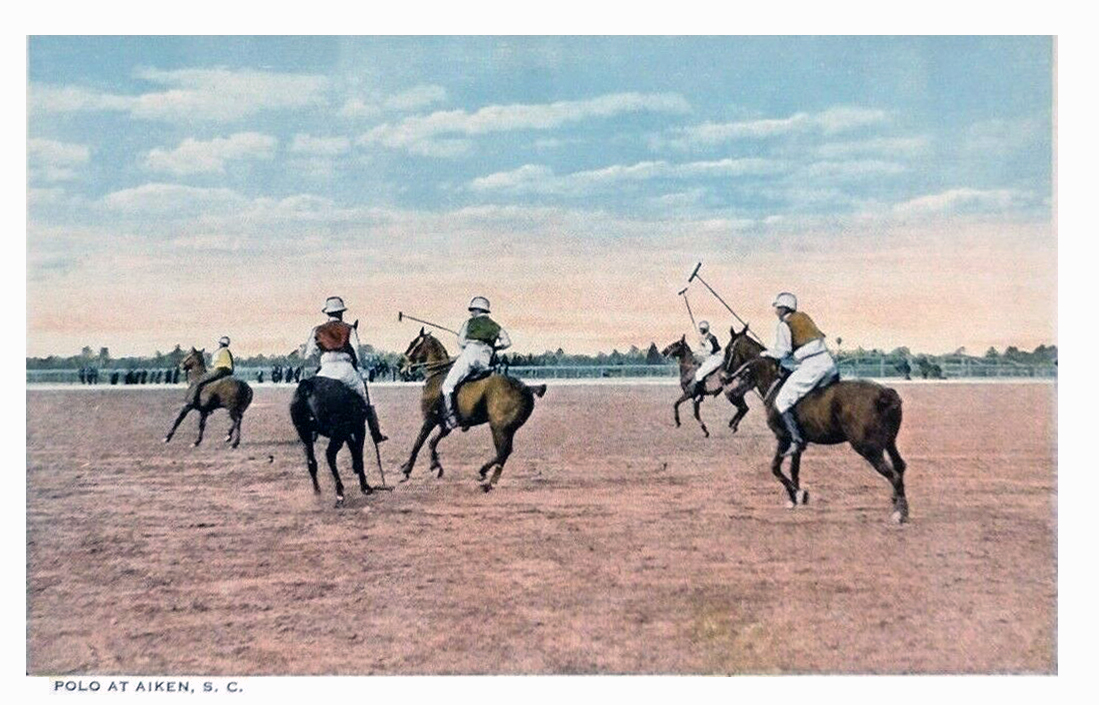
A depiction of Americans playing polo, an Asian-origin game standardized and spread by the British

Western European countries used sport as a method to increase cultural connections between themselves and their colonies. Colonizers also used sport as a way to keep their soldiers fit in tough environments and to create social changes among colonized peoples; the philosophy of Muscular Christianity was influential in this regard in British colonies, and was also put in practice in Asia by the YMCA. This had an intended effect of causing the decline of traditional sports around the world. On the other hand, colonized peoples often used Western sports as an opportunity to prove themselves by defeating their colonizers in said sports; this contributed to many nascent independence movements.

In South Asia, the influence of and resistance to Western sport also led to the standardization of some traditional Indian games such as kabaddi and introduced organized competitions at statewide and national levels for these games. In China, the introduction of Western sports resulted in sports being valued more in terms of their competitive aspects, in contrast to a native emphasis on sports being used for harmony between people and nature. In Japan, Western sports were adopted as part of the Meiji era modernization, and were given values in line with the samurai philosophy of Bushido. In Africa, Western sports were imposed with an eye towards the physical threat posed to colonizers by some of the militaristic training activities that Africans had traditionally practiced, and as a way of arguing that Western civilization was more rational and thus superior to African society by emphasizing the fact that Western sports had more elements of standardization and structure, such as yellow cards, fields with chalked-out straight lines, and stopwatches to measure time periods, than traditional African games.

Some sports were imported to the West from its colonies; for example, the equestrian game of polo, which was discovered by the British in South Asia, was spread by the British worldwide in a British-standardized form. The British also modified some Indian board games to create the modern games of snakes and ladders and ludo.

==== British sports ====
Modern team and competitive sports evolved at British publics schools and at the universities of Oxford and Cambridge. The Industrial Revolution that began in Great Britain in the 18th century brought increased leisure time, leading to more opportunities for British citizens to participate in athletic activities and also follow spectator sports. These trends continued with the advent of mass media and global communication. The bat and ball sport of cricket, which was first played in England during the 16th century, was exported around the globe via the British Empire. A number of popular modern sports were devised or codified in the United Kingdom during the 19th century and obtained global prominence; these include ping pong, modern tennis, association football, netball and rugby. Many sports which originated in Britain were spread throughout the British Empire during the early modern and Victorian eras, with the British sometimes using these sports to propagate British moral values among their colonial subjects, as well as to assert the superiority of British culture. The practices involved in the 'sportization' of English pastimes into global sports were also instrumental in shaping the standardization of sports in other parts of the world.

==== American sports ====
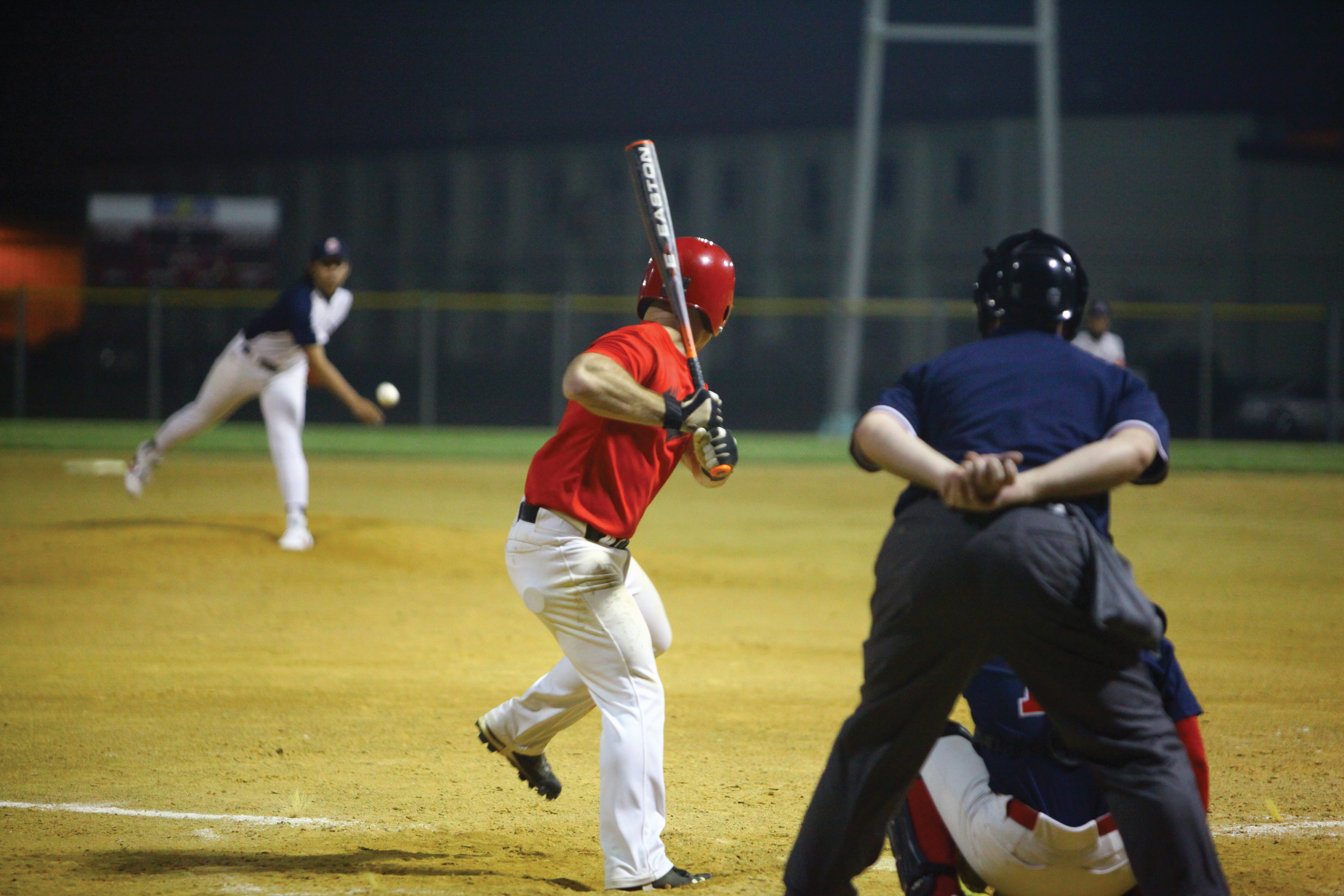
A baseball game being played between American Marines and Japanese players. Baseball is a game invented by the English, modified by America, and became a popular sport in Japan and neighboring countries.

The United States also developed unique variations of English sports: English migrants took antecedents of baseball to America during the colonial period, and the history of American football can be traced to early versions of rugby football and association football. Many games are known as "football" were being played at colleges and universities in the United States in the first half of the 19th century. American football resulted from several major divergences from rugby, most notably the rule changes instituted by Walter Camp, the "Father of American football". Basketball was invented in 1891 by James Naismith, a Canadian physical education instructor working in Springfield, Massachusetts, in the United States. Volleyball was created in Holyoke, Massachusetts, a city directly north of Springfield, in 1895. In the case of lacrosse, a Native American sport became a professional American sport.

The United States pioneered the professionalization of sports; leagues like Major League Baseball, National Football League, and the National Basketball Association are still among the wealthiest leagues in the world. Many sports which were professionalized were originally children's games; baseball, for example, began to be taken more seriously when gamblers saw an opportunity to commercialize the sport and started pioneering rigorous statistical reporting for baseball games to create investment opportunities.

America introduced some of its sports to various Asian countries (including American colonies in Asia); this resulted in baseball becoming established in Japan and basketball becoming popular in China. Mark Dyreson has argued that the spread of baseball was modeled in some ways off of Britain's similar stance at the time of exporting British sports throughout its empire to spread British values. Japanese colonization of East Asia helped to spread baseball and other Western sports in the region.

=== Contemporary era ===
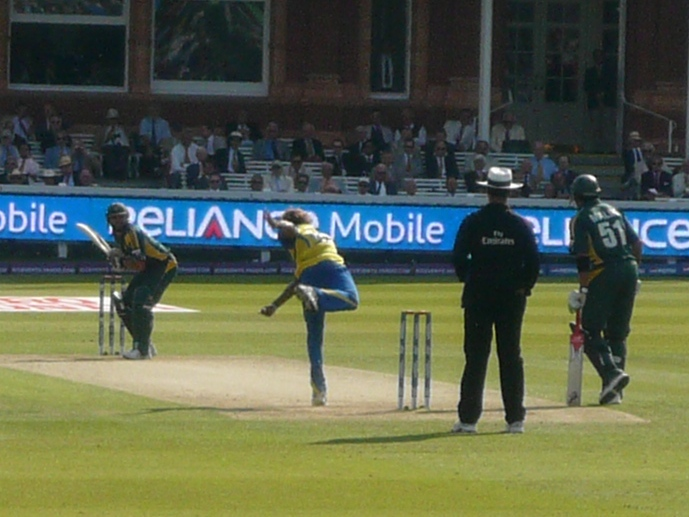
A bowler about to deliver the ball to the batter in cricket. Cricket's T20 format and its associated leagues have rapidly globalised, with the Indian Premier League now among the richest sports leagues in the world.

Even as European colonization of the world came to an end after World War 2, Western sports continued to play a prominent role. Western sports became an important part of nation-building and diplomacy for some newly independent countries; for example, cricket played a significant role in helping India unite its diverse peoples and conduct diplomacy when it faced tensions with its neighbor Pakistan, and when Japan was undergoing its post-war occupation, baseball was promoted by Americans as a way of creating reconciliation. Another example of diplomacy was the launching of the Asian Games, which were meant to promote Pan-Asianism.

Western sports also play an important role in the promotion of health and good societal values (such as gender equality) in former colonies, and are generally seen as an important part of the modernization process. The worldwide dominance of Western sports has also resulted in competitions based in Western countries overtaking the popularity of local competitions in other parts of the world, and the further decline of non-Western sports. Western sports have also grown because of their economic dominance and brand identification among fans.

The Olympic Games, though they initially started off with an emphasis on including traditional games from around the world, eventually became a major transmission vector for Western sports, with Western nations dominating in the event. However, some non-Western sports such as judo have over time become part of the Olympics.

E-sports have emerged in the modern era; video game adaptations of Western sports have also become popular, such as the FIFA video game series. Some traditional Western games have also been adapted into major professional competitions, as is the case with World Chase Tag for the game of tag.

== Major multi-sport events ==
The logo of the Olympic Games

=== Olympic Games ===
The modern Olympic Games (Olympics; French: Jeux olympiques) (Note: English and French are the official languages of the Olympic Movement.) are a series of international multi-sport events. Considered among the biggest sporting events in the world, the Olympics are organised into distinct Summer and Winter Games, each featuring different sports. The Olympic Games, open to both amateur and professional athletes, involve thousands of athletes and more than 200 teams, each team representing a sovereign state or territory. The Games often, but not always, substitute for any world championships during the year in which they take place. The Summer and Winter Olympics are each held every four years, and themselves occur two years apart within the four-year Olympiad. This arrangement has been in place since the 1994 Winter Olympics, prior to which the Summer and Winter Games were held in the same year.

Their creation was inspired by the ancient Olympic Games, held in Olympia, Greece, from the 8th century BC to the 4th century AD. Baron Pierre de Coubertin founded the International Olympic Committee (IOC) in 1894, leading to the first modern Games in Athens in 1896. The IOC is the governing body of the Olympic Movement, which encompasses all entities and individuals involved in the Olympic Games. The Olympic Charter defines their structure and authority.

=== Commonwealth Games ===
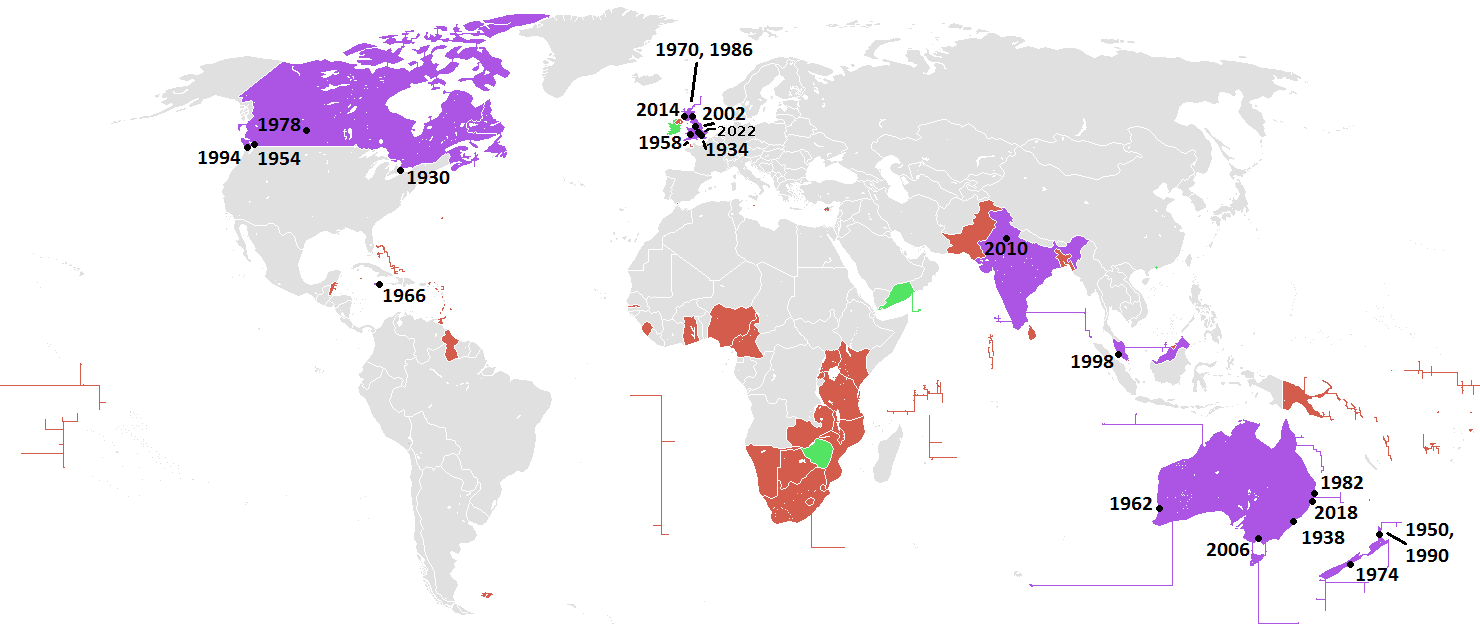
A map of the various countries which have hosted the Commonwealth Games, which are mainly contested by former British colonies

The Commonwealth Games (Note: Which also refers itself as the Comm Games.) is a quadrennial international multi-sport event that brings together athletes from across the Commonwealth of Nations, a political association comprising the majority of former territories of the British Empire. First held as the British Empire Games in 1930, the event has evolved through several name changes, reflecting the changing geopolitical landscape and gradual decolonisation of the Empire. It was known as the British Empire Games until 1950, the British Empire and Commonwealth Games until 1966, and the British Commonwealth Games until 1974. Since the 1978 edition, the event has been officially known as the Commonwealth Games, a name that reflects its modern identity while maintaining its historic connection to Britain. The games are also referred to as the Friendly Games. The Games, one of the oldest multi-sports events outside of the modern Olympic Games, directly inspired similar events such as Jeux de la Francophonie and the Lusofonia Games for former French and Portuguese territories respectively.

== List of sports ==
=== Athletics ===
Pictogram for Athletics at the Summer Olympics

Athletics is a group of sporting events involving competitive running, jumping and throwing. The most common types of athletics competitions are track and field, road running, cross-country running, and race walking.

=== Bat-and ball games ===
Bat-and-ball games, or safe haven games, are field games played by two opposing teams. Typically, action starts when the fielding or defending team delivers a ball toward a dedicated player of the batting or attacking team, who tries to hit it with a bat and then run between various safe areas in the field to score runs (points). The defending team can use the ball in various ways against the attacking team's players to force them off the field ("get them out") when they are not in safe zones, and thus prevent them from further scoring. (Note: In some games for a small number of players, such as workup and the way old cat games, there are no teams and players rotate through the positions.) The best known modern bat-and-ball games are cricket and baseball, with common roots in the 18th-century games played in England.

==== Baseball ====
Baseball is a bat-and-ball sport played between two teams of nine players each, taking turns batting and fielding. The game occurs over the course of several plays, with each play beginning when a player on the fielding team, called the pitcher, throws a ball that a player on the batting team, called the batter, tries to hit with a bat. The objective of the offensive team (batting team) is to hit the ball into the field of play, away from the other team's players, allowing its players to run the bases, having them advance counter-clockwise around four bases to score what are called "runs". The objective of the defensive team (fielding team) is to prevent batters from becoming runners, and to prevent runners advancing around the bases. A run is scored when a runner legally advances around the bases in order and touches home plate (the place where the player started as a batter).

==== Cricket ====
Cricket is a bat-and-ball game that is played between two teams of eleven players on a field, at the centre of which is a pitch with a wicket at each end, each comprising two bails (small sticks) balanced on three stumps. Two players from the batting team, the striker and nonstriker, stand in front of either wicket holding bats, while one player from the fielding team, the bowler, bowls the ball toward the striker's wicket from the opposite end of the pitch. The striker's goal is to hit the bowled ball with the bat and then switch places with the nonstriker, with the batting team scoring one run for each of these swaps. Runs are also scored when the ball reaches the boundary of the field or when the ball is bowled illegally.

=== Goal sports ===
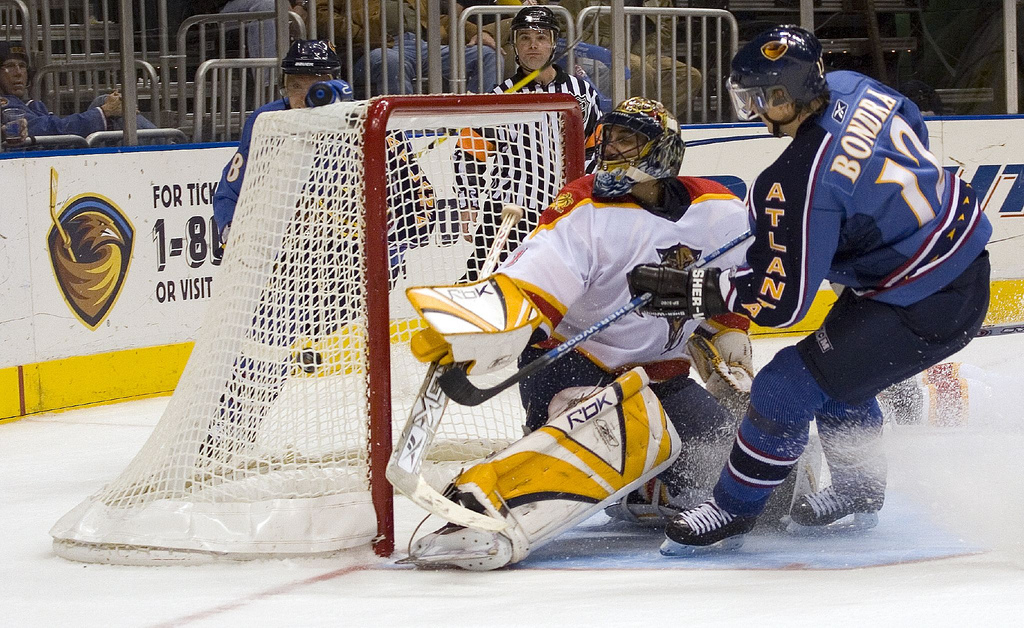
Peter Bondra scoring a goal in ice hockey

Multipurpose basketball and futsal/handball goalpost

In sport, a goal may refer to either an instance of scoring, or to the physical structure or area where an attacking team must send the ball or puck in order to score points. The structure of a goal varies from sport to sport, and one is placed at or near each end of the playing field for each team to defend. Sports which feature goal scoring are also commonly known as invasion games.

==== Basketball ====
Basketball is a team sport in which two teams of five players each (excluding substitutes) oppose one another on a rectangular court. Players compete with the primary objective of shooting a basketball through a hoop (a basket mounted to a backboard) at each end of the court. Teams alternate between offense (when they attempt to score), and defense (when they try to prevent the opposing side from scoring). A field goal is worth two points, unless made from behind the three-point line, when it is worth three. After a foul, timed play stops and the fouled team either takes one to three free throws worth one point each, or restarts play with an inbound pass. The team with the most points at the end of the game wins. If regulation play expires with the score tied, most basketball leagues mandate additional periods of play (overtime) until the score is no longer tied.

==== Football ====
Football is a family of team sports in which the object is to get the ball over a goal line, into a goal, or between goalposts using merely the body (by carrying, throwing, or kicking).

==== Hockey ====
Hockey is a family of stick sports where two opposing teams use hockey sticks to propel a ball or disk into a goal. There are many types of hockey, and the individual sports vary in rules, numbers of players, apparel, and playing surface. Hockey includes both summer and winter variations that may be played on an outdoor field, sheet of ice, or an indoor gymnasium. Some forms of hockey require skates, either inline, roller or ice, while others do not. The various games are usually distinguished by proceeding the word hockey with a qualifier, as in field hockey, ice hockey, roller hockey, rink hockey, or floor hockey.

=== Golf ===
Golf is a club-and-ball sport in which players use various clubs to hit a ball into a series of holes on a course in as few strokes as possible. The game was first played in the 15th century in Scotland, and as such, the country is often accredited as "the home of Golf".

=== Racket sports ===
Racket sports (or racquet sports) are games in which players use a racket or paddle to hit a ball or a shuttlecock. A racket has a handled frame with an open hoop that supports a network of tightly stretched strings. A paddle, sometimes called a bat, has a solid face rather than a network of strings, but may be perforated with a pattern of holes, or be covered with a textured surface.

== See also ==
- Traditional games
- Western physical culture
- Sport in Asia
- Sport in Africa
