= Wicket (sport) =

18th-century American form of cricket

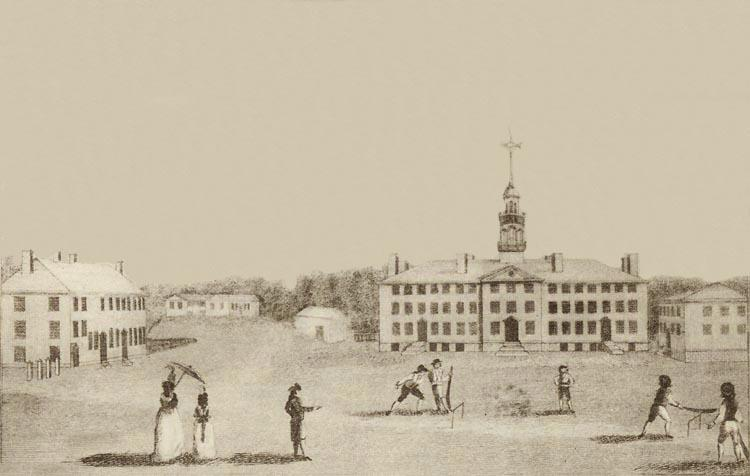
A 1793 depiction of a wicket match being played in front of Dartmouth College.

Wicket or wicket ball was a historical American form of cricket played until the late 19th century.

== History ==
Wicket came to America from England most likely during the late 17th century. George Washington playing a match in 1778 during the Revolutionary War, the sport was regularly played by soldiers as a way to maintain physical health.

The 19th-century rise in popularity of baseball, which had a far shorter playing duration than contemporary forms of cricket, saw cricket’s decline as the most popular bat-and-ball sport of America. In response, cricket fans sought new ways to keep the sport relevant; with wicket pursued as a shorter and higher-scoring version of cricket. Rejected by many traditional cricket fans, the turn of the 20th century saw wicket disappear even from its stronghold of Connecticut.

== Rules ==
Wicket used a wicket which was much wider and shorter than a cricket wicket, and a bat that resembled a spoon. There were up to 30 fielders and 3 innings, making the game finish in an afternoon.

The creases that batters had to run across to score runs were called "Tick Marks", scoring a run (which happened when the batters crossed each other running to the other wicket) could be called a "cross", and the cricket pitch where the ball was bowled was 75 feet (23 m) long and called an alley. Run outs were known as "ticking [out]" the batter. In some forms of wicket, a batter could be out in a way resembling leg before wicket if the ball hit them on the body (known as a "sham" or "shinning") thrice under certain circumstances.

== See also ==
=== Historical North American bat-and-ball games ===
- Town ball
- Old cat
