= Globalization of sports =

Globalization of sports refers to the process of expansion of the idea of sport across the world and phenomena is how that are associated with it. The field of sports in the 20th-21st century was influenced by the process of globalization. Globalization not only impacts the way in which sports are conducted and organised but also how they are perceived and what they mean in today's world.citizens of non participating countries can also watch and enjoy the live sports

== Origins ==
The roots of modern sports can be found in the mid-nineteenth century in Great Britain and the United States where first professional sports were organised in mining and industrial towns and cities. Back then, sport competition was conducted mostly on local and national level. First signs of globalization in that matter appeared because of the global hegemonic position that Great Britain had in the nineteenth century. Due to the British influence, popularity of such sports as football, rugby or cricket grew all over the world, replacing traditional local games.

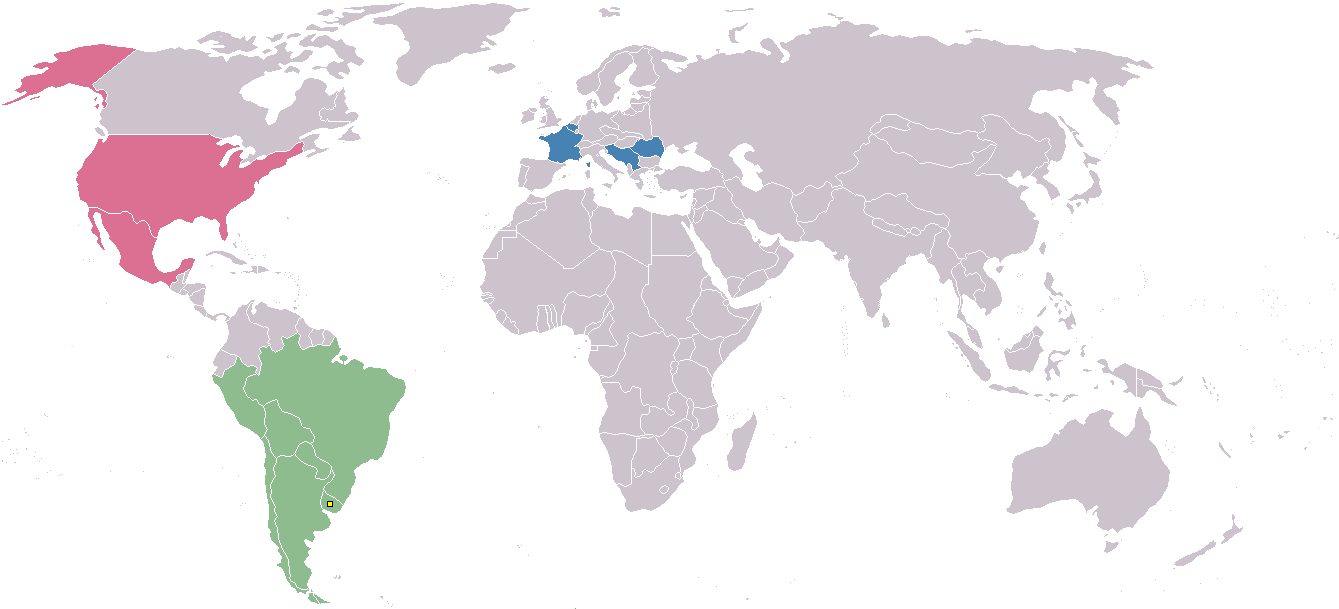
Teams of the FIFA World Cup 1930

Another step in the globalization of sports was taken with the establishment of the International Olympic Committee in 1894 and the revival of the Olympic Games in 1896. The first modern Olympic Games were organised in its ancient birthplace of Athens and attracted athletes from fourteen nations. Despite that most of the participants were European, the Olympic Games of 1896 initiated regularly held international sport competition that soon spread on a global scale. In 1904 in Paris, the International Federation of Association Football (FIFA) was founded by representatives of France, Belgium, Denmark, Netherlands, Spain, Sweden and Switzerland. Shortly after, other European associations joined and by 1909 FIFA was consisted only from nations of the “old continent”. This state of affairs did not last long and South Africa was the first country from overseas that joined the Federation followed by Argentina and Chile (1912) and the United States (1913). This allowed FIFA to start its global activities and in 1930 the first FIFA World Cup was organised. The tournament which was hosted in Uruguay was announced successful despite that only four European teams were able to participate. Meanwhile other international sport federations started appearing and after the World War II, when the United States rose as a global power, “American” sports like basketball and volleyball began getting more popularity around the world. International Volleyball Federation (FIVB) organised their first World Championship in 1949 while International Basketball Federation (FIBA) hosted theirs in 1950.

Later on, globalization of sports was fueled by the expansion of technology and the introduction of commercial aspects to sports. On one hand newspaper, radio and especially television exposed sports to the wider international audience (first FIFA World Cup was televised in 1956 and first Summer Olympics in 1960), on the other commercial advertising allowed to profit from them.

== Globalization of football ==
It is common to refer association football as the global game or the world's game. It differs from other sports that it made a significant impression in every continent and in most regions and nations.

The game of football traveled with the movement of people. Migration, both short and long term, was essential to its dissemination, with those in peripatetic occupations playing a key role. Football spread both spatially and across social groups, but identifying models or common patterns is fraught with difficulties. Its initial journey through the regions and nations of Great Britain was particularly complex. As founders of the modern game, the British were undoubtedly its most important international disseminators. They were to be found almost everywhere in the late nineteenth and early twentieth centuries, not just in the territories of the empire but also often itinerant in nature - were to the fore in Britain's sporting diaspora. Mention is often made of the sailors and soldiers who carried footballs in their kitbags and knapsacks, but the mobile agents of British commerce and education were probably most important of all in the global spread of the game. In Spain, British mining engineers are said to have first played football in 1893; in Russia, it was Lancastrian factory manager Harry Charnock who introduced it to his textile workforce; and in Uruguay, a teacher at the English High School, William Leslie Poole, is credited with founding the first club and football league. British expatriate communities offered a suitable environment for the fomentation of the game. The British influence on the emergence of football in continental Europe was substantial, but it was not always direct. For them, Britain was not an archaic but one associated with technological advancement, social and economic transformation, and as well modernity. To speak English, and to follow British leisure pursuits, was a symbol of cosmopolitan sophistication.

Football, along with other British sports, was highly fashionable. In the creation of football clubs across Europe, connections and associations with Britain were frequently more important than the British themselves. The game traveled via the transnational networks of education, industry, and commerce, with many of the continent's clubs the product of cross-national alliances and cosmopolitan perspectives. Football moved first to parts of Europe most closely connected with Britain economically and culturally, with education representing a particularly important link. Denmark, Belgium, and Switzerland, and then the Netherlands, the Scandinavian countries, France, and Germany were the earliest to take up the game. It spread as part of wider cross-cultural networks based on trade, education, and technology and characterized by the mobility of people and the transfer of ideas. Second, there was a crucial cross-cultural dimension to the game's introduction in Latin America. In Chile, for instance, where organized football began among British immigrants working in banking and mining, football soon became representative of a complex amalgam of racial, national, and international relationships and rivalries.

Continued interactions between Latin American and European football cultures in the early decades of the twentieth century also complicate the notion of discrete "British" and "national" stages of development. Europe was undoubtedly important in enhancing interest in the game and influencing how the locals played, but there was surely more reciprocity in these encounters than is normally acknowledged. The tourists learned lessons too, about the game itself but also about how it might be promoted to increase public enthusiasm back home. The impact of touring Argentinian, Brazilian, and Uruguayan club and national teams in Europe during the 1920s, and of large numbers of imported players at French, Spanish, and Italian clubs in the 1930s, was in certain respects a continuation of this two-directional, "mutual" influence between European and Latin American football.

Colonial and trading links were crucial factors in the pattern of football's diffusion in Africa and Asia. The game's arrival was dependent upon the influence of European colonizers. It arrived in the late nineteenth century through the main port cities and expanded into the interior via railways, Western-style schools, and the colonial military. In Africa, as in other continents, football spread sideways from place to place, not just outward from Europeans to locals. African intermediaries, civil servants, interpreters, soldiers, policeman, traders, and railway and port workers—were instrumental in spreading the game into the interior. It was the relationship between local circumstances and regional, imperial, or global contexts that invariably determined whether or not football took root.

== Contemporary world ==
Since the end of the 2nd world war, the globalization of sports rapidly accelerated by bringing television and corporate sponsorship. It led to the commercialization of sport and gave birth to the sport industry. Therefore, in the context of globalization, sport in the contemporary world can be characterized by the following tendencies:

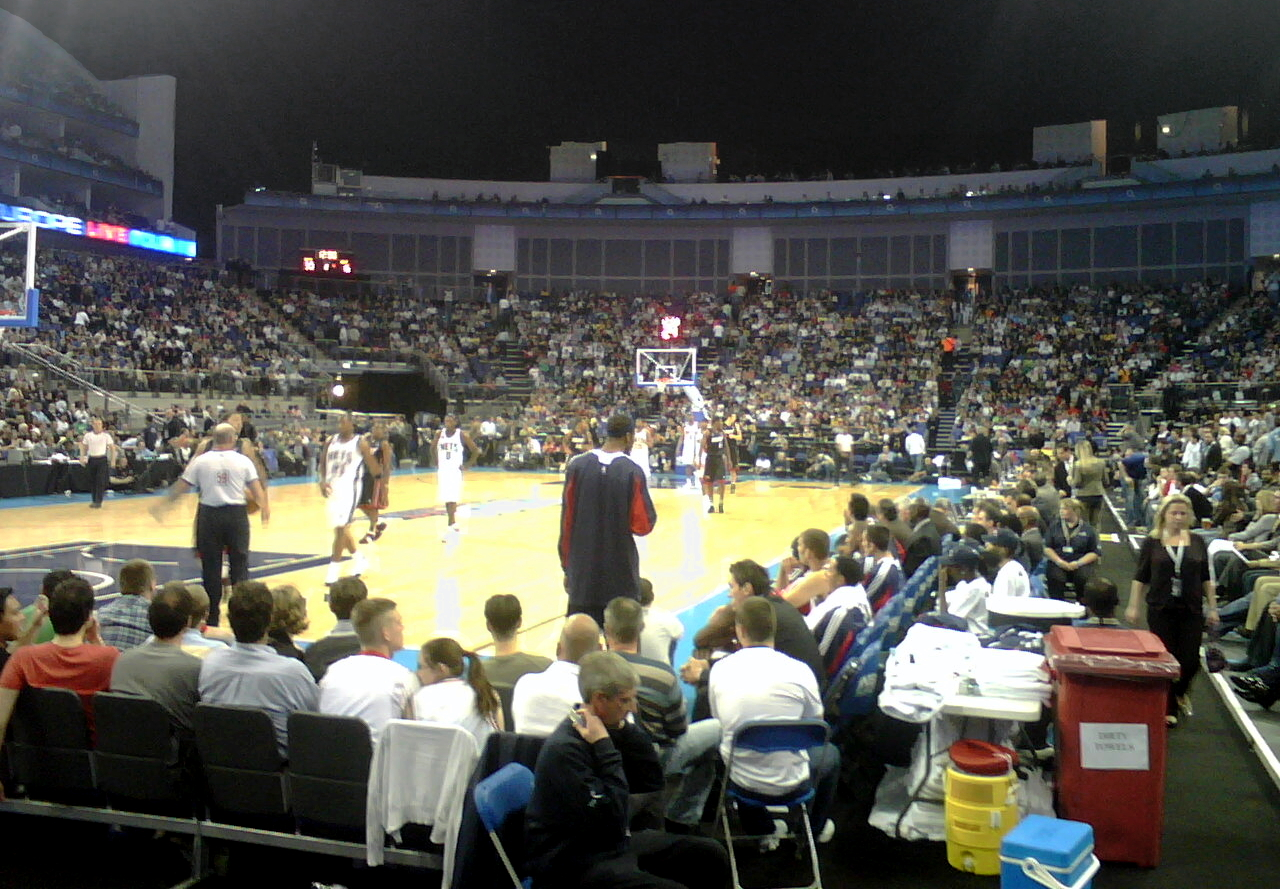
New Jersey Nets during NBA Global Games in London in 2008

- Increased involvement of global telecommunication companies allows international sport organizations and federations such as the International Olympic Committee or International Federation of Association Football to generate enormous revenues by selling television rights.
- Increased involvement of transnational companies (even those not connected to the sports industry) leads to a new trend of “naming” in which sponsor's name or label is associated with stadium, sports arena, team or sports contest.
- Involvement of those companies leads to the professionalization of sports that allows formerly amateur athletes to earn money. In the same time, at the highest level, we can observe enormous growth of income among athletes.
- Promotion of national leagues or team in markets overseas is more and more popular. During pre-season top-tier teams travel to different parts of the world no longer solely to prepare themselves for the upcoming season but rather to promote their team, league, merchandise and sponsors - European football teams organize matches and tournaments in the North America and Asia, while American basketball teams travel to Europe and Asia.
- Future expansion of regional tournaments, leagues and competitions to new geographic areas becomes a new possibility. Even though some games of the regular season of the National Basketball Association (NBA) were already organized outside of the United States and Canada, there are further plans of establishing a team based in London or even adding several European teams to the Association. On the other hand the president of the Union of European Football Associations (UEFA) suggested that UEFA Champions League final could be played outside of Europe - for example in New York.
- Increased diversity in athletes’ origins participating in national professional leagues around the world as well as the number of countries participating in sports events.

== Controversies ==
Globalization of sports has also a negative impact that can be visible in the following issues:

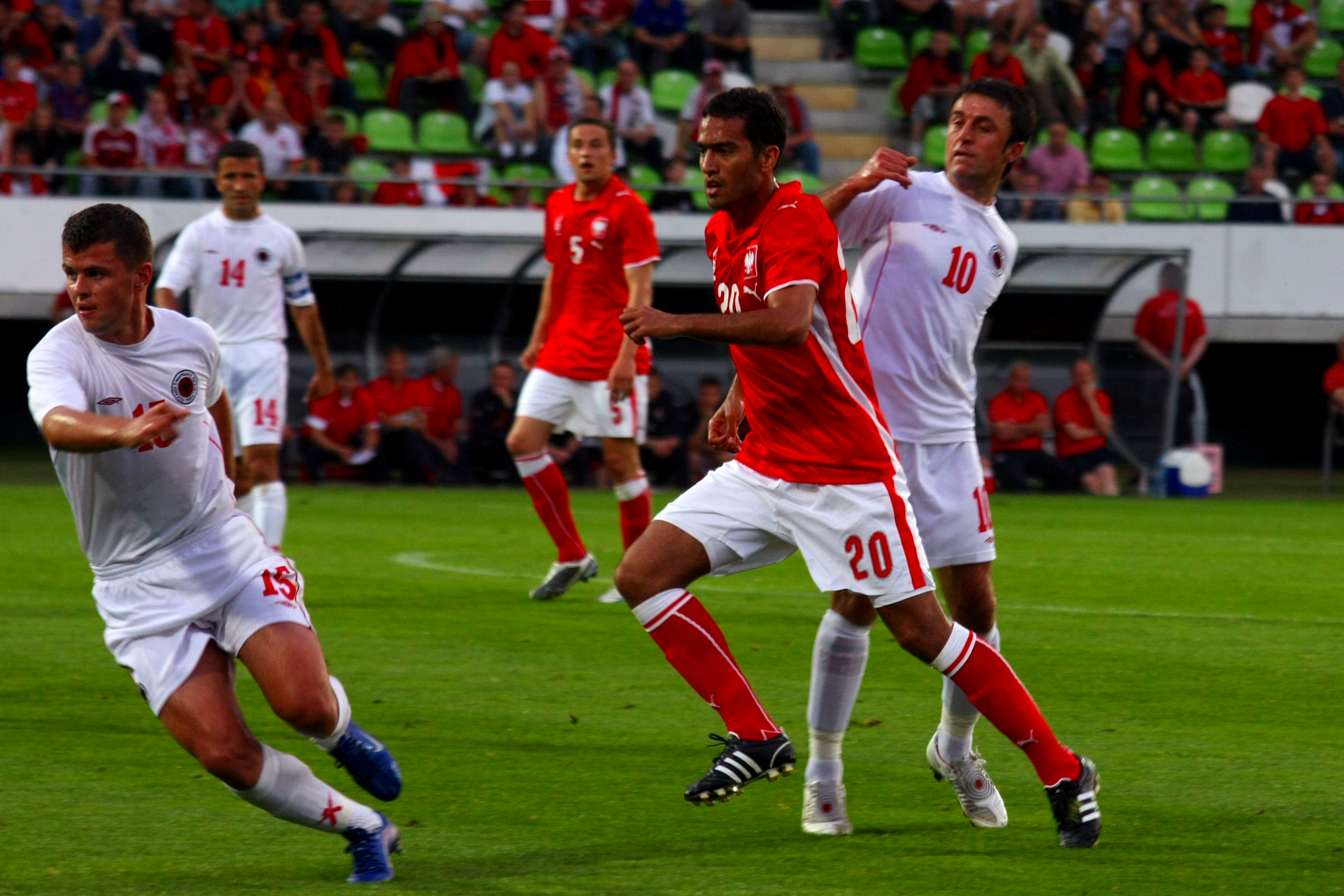
Brazilian player Roger Guerreiro (in red in the foreground) playing for Poland national football team

- Because of globalization and commercialization, the value of a certain sport is very often determined by the size of available audience for media, advertisers and sponsors. It undermines basic principles of sport and may eventually lead to a decrease in the diversity in sport and sporting heritage.
- Even though migration and movement of athletes can be seen as something positive there are some controversies around it. First of all, rich countries are able to drain talent from poorer countries negatively influencing their sport system. That happened in the case of the massive exodus of Kenyan athletes who were lured by opportunities offered by Qatar and Bahrain. Secondly, globalization led to a trend of recruiting athletes from other countries in order to compete in international sport events. In that case citizenship and affiliation are easily exchanged for the right sport skills and abilities.
- Globalization of sports creates also possibilities for different kinds of criminal activity. Match fixing and referee corruption are a rising threat because of the growth of international betting and gambling on sports events. Alleged corruption of officials of the most important international sport organizations and associations (like FIFA) may lead to controversies associated with organization of sport events. In the same time, those big sport institutions may be used as tools for money laundering. Another issue that shows the dark side of globalization of sports is the use of banned athletic performance-enhancing drugs.

== See also ==
- Nationalism and sport
- Politics and sports
