= Backboard shattering =

Basketball phenomenon

A backboard shattering during a basketball game between the Rochester RazorSharks and Battle Creek Knights on April 19, 2009

A backboard shattering (also known as backboard breaking or backboard smash) is an accident or stunt in basketball. It occurs when a player performs a slam dunk with sufficient force to shatter or otherwise destroy the tempered glass of the backboard, often causing the hoop to break off as well. The game is usually canceled or delayed, and the act incurs a foul for the offending player and costs of cleanup and replacement. Shattering a backboard can be dangerous, sending small pieces of the backboard glass flying, potentially injuring players, sideline press personnel, referees, or spectators. In the National Basketball Association (NBA), shattering a backboard during a game is penalized with a "non-unsportsmanlike" technical foul and a possible fine towards the player. The player may not be ejected, nor shall the foul count towards a player's total towards either ejection or suspension. The referee also has latitude to waive the foul, if it is determined the shattering was accidental because of a defect in the backboard or its structure, the board was broken during a rebound of the ball from a jump shot, or the player had no intentions to dunk with force.

Throughout the history of basketball, there have always been athletes with the size and strength to dunk through rims. However, the first recorded NBA player to shatter a backboard, Chuck Connors, did not do so with a dunk. When playing for the Boston Celtics in 1946, Connors took a set shot during a pregame warmup, hitting the front of the rim. Because an arena worker had failed to place a protective piece between the rim and the backboard, the backboard shattered. The all-star power forward Gus Johnson of the Baltimore Bullets became famous as a backboard breaker in the NBA, shattering three during his career in the 1960s and early 1970s. In the American Basketball Association (ABA), Charlie Hentz shattered two backboards in the same game on November 6, 1970, resulting in said game being canceled. Arthur Ehrat's invention of a spring-loaded breakaway rim led to the return of the dunk in college basketball.

An often-cited game with a backboard smash was on August 26, 1985, when Michael Jordan dunked so hard during a Nike exhibition game in Trieste that the backboard was completely broken. The signed jersey and shoes (including one of the tiny shards of glass in the sole of the left shoe) that Jordan wore during this famous game were later auctioned. The moment the glass was broken was filmed and is often cited around the world as a particularly important milestone in Jordan's rise.

Darryl Dawkins and Shaquille O'Neal gained notoriety for shattering backboards during their careers; Dawkins' incidents are credited for being the impetus for the research and introduction of breakaway rims throughout the sport, while O'Neal dunked with enough force to break the harnesses holding two backboards during games against the New Jersey Nets and Phoenix Suns in the 1992–93 NBA season. The following year, backboards had strengthened steel braces and increased stability to prevent the hoop from falling down. A technical foul for purposive backboard shattering, differentiating from an accidental shatter by the determination of intent, was also introduced.

Most venues with ceiling-mounted backboards and older backstops have their rings attached directly to the glass. Modern FIBA Level 1 competition units (as used in NCAA, NBA, Euroleague and FIBA competitions) use a direct-mount system, where the basket ring is attached to a metal beam, with a hole in the backboard where the beam is connected to the unit. On such a system, stress from a dunk is distributed to the beam to the entire unit (as seen in O'Neal's dunk in Phoenix). On a four-corner mount, the glass still bears stress from a dunking player, which leads to shattering the backboard. The switch to a direct-mount system and the higher standards for backboard stability imposed by the NBA and later FIBA, including a 2020 rule change requiring the retirement of the entire goal stanchion eight years after the original date of manufacture, have made backboard shattering impossible at major level competition. Some competitions have expanded it further into mandating a specification backstop, including high school and college sanctioning bodies. For example, the Euroleague bylaws require a specification backstop from Spalding, which also supplies the league's game balls.
