= Internet-nationalism =

Nationalism expressed through digital platforms

Internet-nationalism, also referred to as cyber-nationalism, digital-nationalism, or online-nationalism, is a form of nationalism that utilizes digital platforms and online spaces to promote national identity, mobilize nationalist groups, and conduct activities ranging from propaganda dissemination to cyberwarfare against other nations. This phenomenon encompasses both grassroots movements of like-minded individuals gathering in virtual communities and state-sponsored activities aimed at advancing national interests through digital means. As a social phenomenon, cyber-nationalism manifests through nationalistic groups coordinating online activities, including offensive actions such as cyberattacks and election interference targeting other countries. This digital form of nationalism has been documented in several countries including Japan, Russia, and China, where it serves various governmental and grassroots nationalist objectives.

== Background ==
The Internet makes it easy to communicate without physical borders. Through digitization, people who are living in different counties, can communicate better than before. It is theorized that physical borders, which once prevented homophilous actors from congregating, are absent on the internet, allowing people of like mind to meet and politically or socially mobilize, whereas pre-internet they were unable to. Others, however, have argued that this idea is idealistic. Users on the internet tend to harbor a strong dislike towards each other, unlike the expectation.

== By country ==
=== China ===
In China, cyber-nationalism is very active. Chinese nationalists and the Chinese communist party use the Internet resources available to them (considering that the Internet is restricted in China by censorship and the Great Firewall) to organize online and recruit further supporters. The isolationist view and xenophobic tendency are also consistently ridiculed in this aspect of Chinese cyber nationalism.

Other Chinese nationalists use the Internet to hack, spam, and otherwise influence the technological infrastructure of nations the nationalists consider anti-China, primarily members of the European Union, the United States and Japan. Many Western observers, as well as Chinese dissidents, believe that cyber-nationalist and hacking efforts are aided or organized by the Chinese government. However, there are individuals and organizations who voluntarily carry out their own cyber initiatives to defend their country. In 2016, Little Pink, an organization composed of young digital nationalists, attacked the social media account of Chou Tzu-yu after the Taiwanese pop singer waved Taiwan's flag on a television show.

A number of the cyber nationalist activities are said to be reactive or event-driven and forced by actors or instances when China's national interests are damaged. For instance, there is an increase in anti-American cyber nationalistic movement every time the U.S. elevated its threat level against China. These movements often include cyber attacks such as the case of the China Eagle Club, a hacker organization that carried out the so-called Taiwan Blitz designed to combat Chen Shui-bian's ascent to power.

=== Japan ===
In Japan, recently cyber-nationalists (netto-uyoku) have become very active. They communicate with each other on the internet. In 2009, some part of the cyber-nationalist took actions against Korean tourists in the Tsushima Island, which is located near South Korea. Footage of this can be found on YouTube. According to Rumi Sakamoto, "This episode is just one expression of Japan’s new grassroots nationalism, which has gained force over the last decade against the backdrop of increasingly vociferous historical revisionism and neo-nationalism." In the past these kind of actions would not have raised public awareness, but the internet makes it easy for these groups to get public attention.

=== Russia ===
In Russia, nationalist groups use the Internet to solicit donations, recruit and organize. After the Russo-Georgian war, groups on Facebook such as "Abkhazia is not Georgia" and other Internet communities formed. Since many ethnic Russians were worried about terrorism from the Caucasus region, Russian nationalists doxxed students who are studying in Caucasian universities. They also proliferated propaganda videos in which dark-skinned young people are beating up ethnic Russians.

At the same time, anti-Russian government activist groups are recruiting on the Internet. In this case, cyber-nationalism aids in building support for the Chechen Republic and ethnic Chechen people against the Russian state, along with other minority groups that feel marginalized by the Russian Federation under Vladimir Putin.

== See also ==
- Nationalism and esports
