= Traditional sports and games =

Pre-modern/non-Western heritage sports

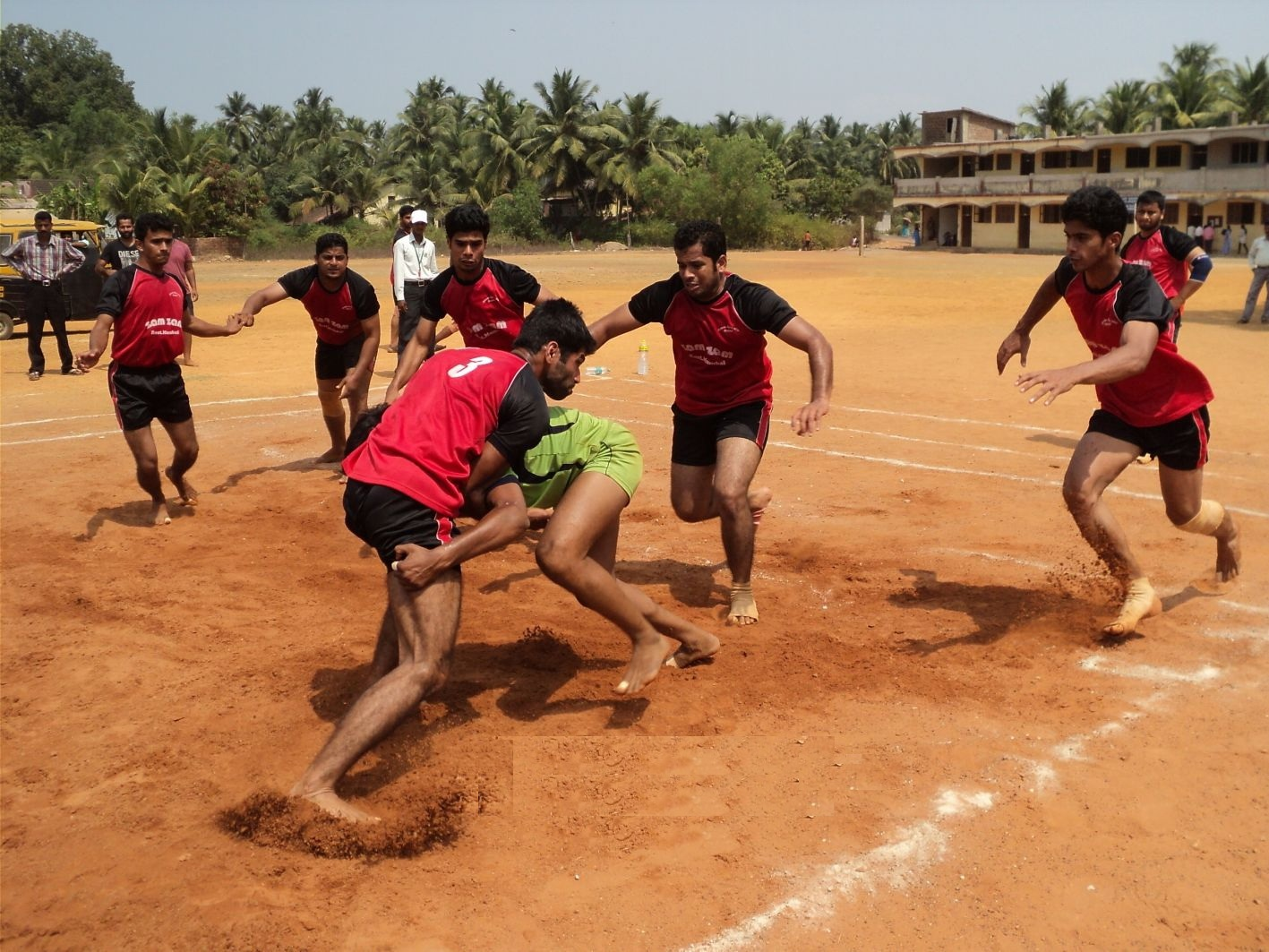
Kabaddi, a traditional Indian game which has become increasingly popular around the world

Traditional sports and games (often abbreviated TSG) are physical activities which were played for centuries by people around the world even before the civilization started, before the advent of modern Western sports. Many TSGs lost popularity or died off during the colonial era due to the imposition and spread of Western sports. Further decline has occurred in the post-colonial era.

UNESCO promotes TSG as a form of "intangible cultural heritage", and had a dedicated TSG Advisory Committee. Four Collective Consultation Meetings: 2006 in Paris, 2009 in Teheran, 2017 in Paris have been held so far by UNESCO, with the fourth one in 2018 in Istanbul gathering more than 82 participants from 40 countries.

TSG has been linked to the way in which various peoples followed religious duties and promoted social cooperation along with a better understanding of their relationship to nature; TSG is also seen as a possible way to increase intercultural dialogue.

== History ==
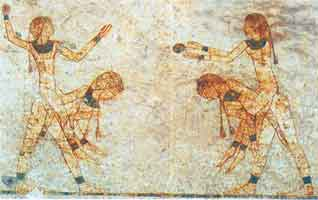
Ancient Egyptian sports game

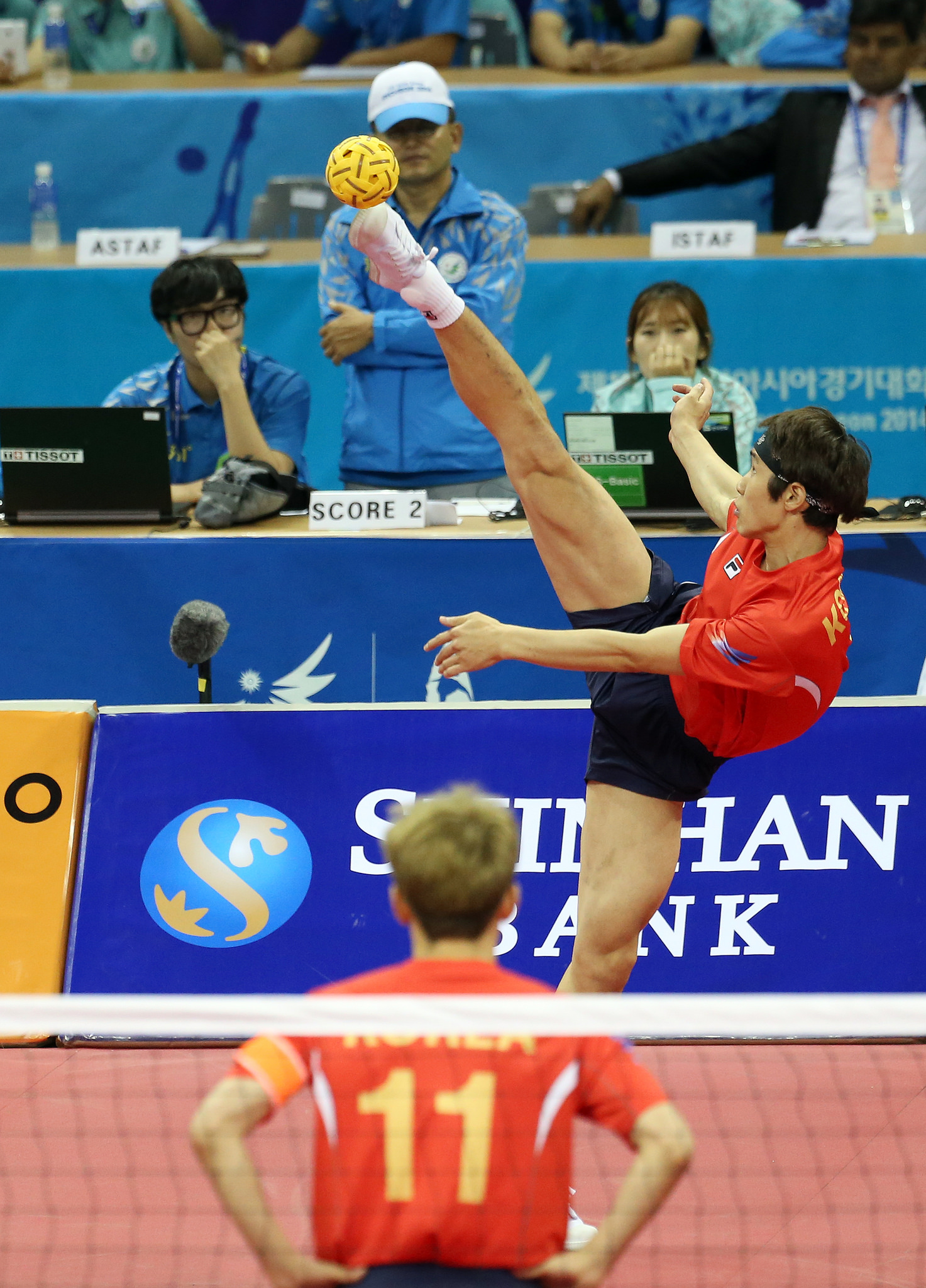
Sepak takraw, a traditional Southeast Asian sport, being played at the 2014 Asian Games in Incheon, Korea

During the colonial era, resistance to and influence from Western sports resulted in the standardization and introduction of organized competition for several traditional South Asian games such as kabaddi.

From the 18th century onwards, researchers have taken a greater interest in the value of traditional games in elucidating cultural values and identities. For example, Joseph Strutt in 1801 wrote that "In order to form a just estimation of the character of any particular people, it is absolutely necessary to investigate the Sports and Pastimes most generally prevalent among them." The modern Olympic Games were influenced by this thinking, and were founded by Pierre de Coubertin on the basis of "All games, all nations", though this aspect of the Olympics was never fully realized and quickly faded away after a few years, with mainly only Western sports being played.

From the 1970's onwards, global attention and institutionalization has taken place to preserve TSG. In some European countries, the revival of traditional games has served as a way for regional identities to be expressed in a political or educational way.

TSG has been increasingly accepted into international multi-sport events such as the Asian Games and SEA Games.

== See also ==
- Ethnosport
- List of children's games
- World Indigenous Games
