= Net (basketball) =

Structure hanging from a basketball rim

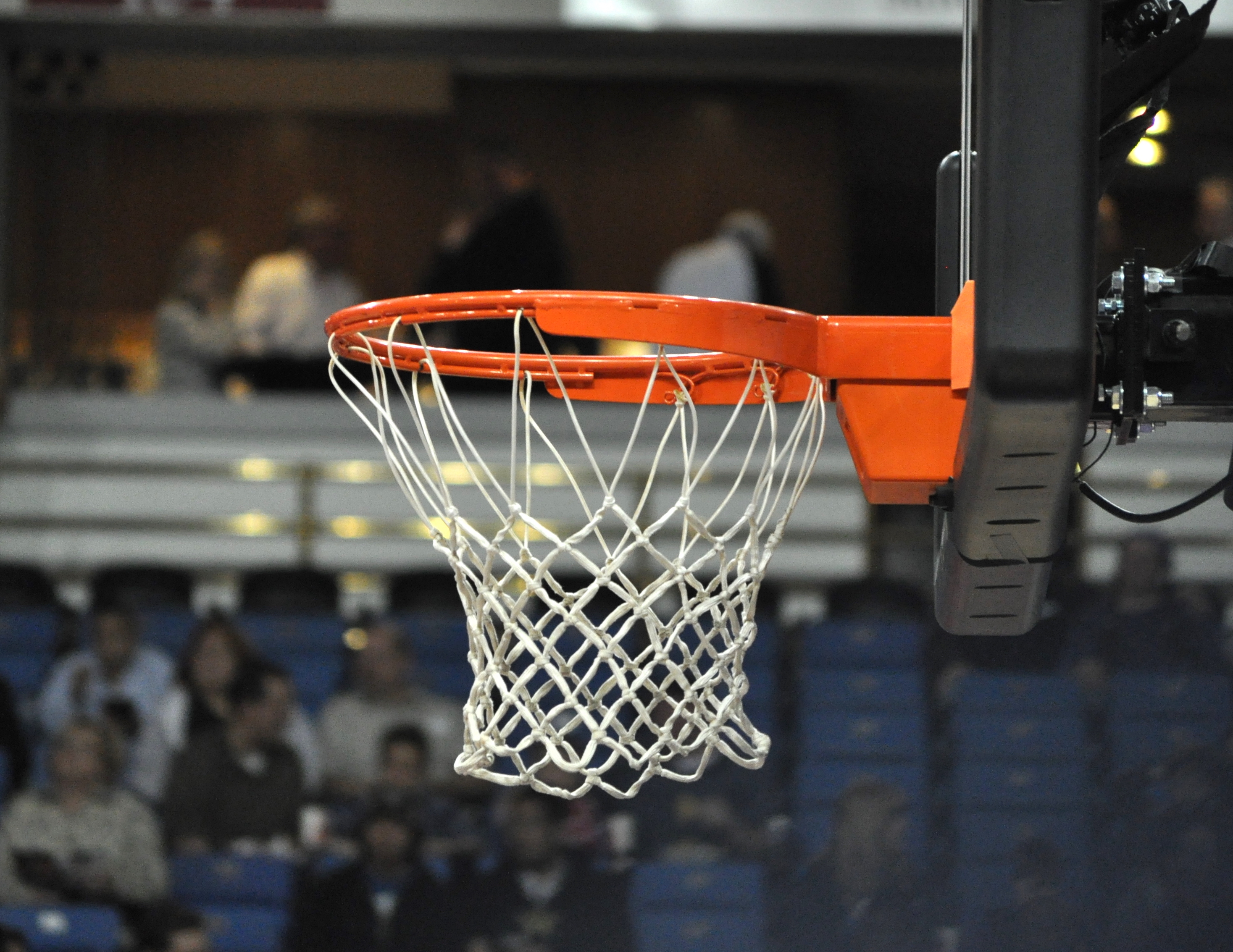
Typical basketball net hanging from a rim

A basketball net is an open-meshed, typically corded or nylon structure that hangs from the rim of a basketball hoop, allowing the ball to pass through while helping to visually and audibly confirm a successful shot. The basketball net was first introduced in 1893, but it wasn't until 1912 that the net was opened at the bottom to allowing the basketball to fall through.

== FIBA's Technical Specifications ==
The nets must be constructed using white cord and shall adhere to the following requirements:

- Suspension: They shall be hung from the rings.
- Functionality: Their design must ensure the ball is momentarily delayed as it passes through the basket.
- Length: They shall measure a minimum of 400 millimetres (16 in) and a maximum of 450 millimetres (18 in).
- Attachment: Each net shall incorporate 12 loops for secure fastening to the ring.

=== Upper Section Design ===
The upper portion of the net shall exhibit semi-rigid properties to mitigate the following:

- Rebound Prevention: The net must not flip upward over or through the ring, which could lead to potential entanglement.
- Ball Retention: The net must neither trap the ball nor cause it to rebound out of the basket.

== Bibliography ==
- FIBA (Fédération Internationale de Basketball Amateur). 2024. Official Basketball Rules 2024: Basketball Equipment. Approved by FIBA Central Board. PDF.
