= Breakaway rim =

Basketball rim that bends during dunking

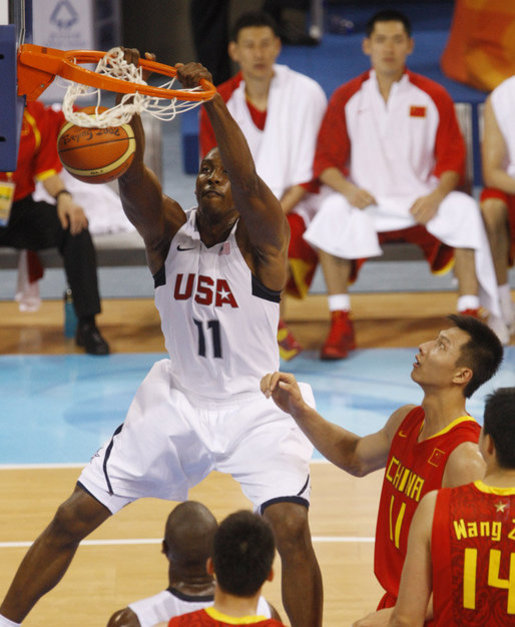
Dwight Howard bends down the rim as he dunks the ball.

A breakaway rim is a basketball rim that contains a hinge and a spring at the point where it attaches to the backboard so that it can bend downward when a player dunks a basketball, and then quickly snaps back into a horizontal position when the player releases it. It allows players to dunk the ball without shattering the backboard, and it reduces the possibility of wrist injuries. Breakaway rims were invented in the mid-1970s and are now an essential element of high-level basketball.

In the early days of basketball, dunking was considered ungentlemanly, and was rarely used outside of practice or warm-up drills. A broken backboard or distorted rim could delay a game for hours. During the 1970s, however, players like Julius Erving and David Thompson of the American Basketball Association popularized the dunk with their athletic flights to the basket, increasing the demand for flexible rims.

While several men claim to have created the breakaway rim, Arthur Ehrat is recognized as the inventor by the Smithsonian Institution's Lemelson Center for the Study of Invention & Innovation. A resident of Lowder, Illinois, Ehrat worked at a grain elevator for most of his life and barely knew anything about basketball. In 1975, his nephew, an assistant basketball coach at Saint Louis University, asked him to help design a rim that could support slam dunks. Using a spring from a John Deere cultivator, Ehrat designed a rim that could bend and spring back after 125 pounds of force were applied to it. He called his device "The Rebounder". In 1982, the US patent office accepted his 1976 application to patent a "deformation-preventing swingable mount for basketball goals". The breakaway rim was first used by the NCAA during the 1978 Final Four in St. Louis. Although Darryl Dawkins shattered two backboards with his dunks in 1979, the old-style bolted rim structure was not phased out of the NBA until the 1981–82 season, when breakaway rims debuted as a uniform equipment upgrade.
