= Town ball =

Precursor to modern baseball

Town ball, townball, or Philadelphia town ball, is a bat-and-ball, safe haven game played in North America in the 18th and 19th centuries, which was similar to rounders and was a precursor to modern baseball. In some areas, including Philadelphia and along the Ohio River and Mississippi River—the local game was called Town Ball. In other regions the local game was named "base", "round ball", "base ball", or just "ball"; after the development of the "New York game" in the 1840s it was sometimes distinguished as the "New England game" or "Massachusetts baseball". The players might be schoolboys in a pasture with improvised balls and bats, or young men in organized clubs. As baseball became dominant, town ball became a casual term to describe old fashioned or rural games similar to baseball.

== Rules ==
The rules of town ball varied, but distinguishing characteristics most often cited were:

- The number of players on a team was usually more than nine.
- There was no foul territory; all struck balls were in play.
- In many versions, base runners could be put out by hitting them with the ball—a practice known as "soaking" or "plugging."

Generally the infield was a square or rectangular shape, with four bases or pegs. Similarly to baseball, the fourth base was called home base, as it was the final goal of a runner. However, differently from baseball—and more like English rounders—the striker would stand between first and fourth base, at a kind of fifth base called the striker's stand. The thrower stood in the middle of the square and delivered the ball to be hit by the striker. If the struck ball were caught in mid-air or on the first bounce, the striker was called out. If no one caught it, the striker became a runner and advanced as many bases as possible, with the option to stop at any base as a safe haven.

In most varieties of the game, fielders could hit the runner with the ball and if he were not on a base he would be called out. But in some, the cross-out was used: the fielder threw the ball so as to cross the runner's path, between him and the next base. A runner who reached fourth base safely was said to have achieved a round or tally.

The concept of innings was used: the team with the bat was "in", until put "out" by the opposing side. If one-out, all-out was the rule, the defensive team only needed to retire one man to end the inning. However, the game might also be played as all-out, all-out, meaning that every player had to be retired (as in cricket) before sides were changed. Matches might be played for an agreed-upon number of innings, or until one side had achieved a requisite number of tallies.

== Town ball and the origins of baseball ==
Townball's role in the origins of baseball has been debated since the early 1900s. In the 1903 edition of Spalding's Official Base Ball Guide, editor Henry Chadwick, who was born in England, wrote "Just as the New York game was improved townball, so was townball an improved form of the two-centuries-old English game of rounders."

Albert Goodwill Spalding, star player, sports equipment entrepreneur, and publisher of the Spalding Guide, asserted that baseball's origins were American. Spalding wrote an article titled "The Origin and Early History of Baseball" for the January 15, 1905 Washington Post. He described the game of Four Old Cat, in which four throwers and four batsmen stand in four corners. "Some ingenious American lad" got the idea of placing one thrower in the center of the square, wrote Spalding. "This was for many years known as the old game of Town Ball, from which the present game of baseball no doubt had its origin, and not from the English children's picnic game of 'Rounders'."

Later, in 1905, Spalding organized a panel of experts known as the Mills Commission to investigate the issue. Abner Graves, whose testimony was the basis of the Mills Commission claim that Abner Doubleday invented baseball in 1839, named townball as the "old" game that the boys of Cooperstown, New York played before baseball. In the townball game that Graves described, the batsman struck the tossed ball with a flat bat, and ran toward a goal fifty feet away, and back again. Graves said there were generally twenty to fifty boys in the field, which generated many collisions among those trying to catch the ball.

== Philadelphia town ball ==
Most accounts of a game called town ball were recorded many years later as reminiscences or memoirs. It is more difficult to find contemporary descriptions. One of the earliest was a New York Clipper article dated September 19, 1857, reporting a "Game of Town Ball" at Germantown (now a neighborhood of Philadelphia). Reporting another game, the Clipper for August 11, 1860, commented, "The Olympic Club dates its existence back to 1832, so that properly speaking it is the parent Town Ball organization in the city of Philadelphia."

Informal groups were playing town ball at Market Street in Philadelphia and across the Delaware River in Camden, New Jersey, in 1831 and 1832. Irving Leitner quotes a 19th-century source: "All the players were over 25 years of age, and to see them playing a game like this caused much merriment among the friends of the players. It required 'sand' in those days to go out on the field and play, as the prejudice against the game was very great."

The two groups merged in 1833 to form the Olympic Ball Club. In the introduction to his book Baseball, John Montgomery Ward wrote of the Philadelphia game:

it is recorded that the first day for practice enough members were not present to make up town-ball, and so a game of "two-old-cat" was played. This town-ball was so nearly like rounders that one must have been the prototype of the other, but town-ball and base-ball were two very different games. When this same town-ball club decided in 1860 to adopt base-ball instead, many of its principal members resigned, so great was the enmity to the latter game.

A copy of the Olympic Ball Club's constitution exists, but it contains only rules for governing the club, and no rules for playing ball. Contemporary accounts describe Philadelphia town ball as played with eleven men on a side, with four bases and the batter standing between fourth and first bases. They played two innings of all-out, all-out or eleven innings of one-out, all-out. Typical games were high-scoring with the victorious side often topping 75 runs. The players are said to have made their own bats and balls. They were adept with two types of bats. For a two-handed swing, a flat cricket-type bat was used. For a one-handed swing, a smaller round model, called a delill, was chosen. There is evidence that over the course of three decades the Olympics played varieties of baseball, wicket, and old cat, as well as town ball.

In Philadelphia Town Ball, "every at bat resulted in a home run or an out". The bases were very close together, and were not safe havens, serving merely to mark the circuit the batter-runner must take. "Soaking" was permitted but rare.

In 1860 the Olympics converted to the modern "New York game", but the old style was still being played in rural areas. That year, members of Athletic of Philadelphia, originally formed as a town ball club, traveled to Mauch Chunk, Pennsylvania, for two contests, one of New York-style baseball and the other of town ball. The Mauch Chunk team defeated the A's, 45–43, at town ball. But playing New York rules, the A's defeated the country players, 34–2. The Athletics were soon to be a national baseball powerhouse. The Olympic Club, after a bitterly publicized rivalry with the A's, dropped out of major match play in 1864, and many of the members went back to playing town ball.

== Town ball in the west ==
- In Cincinnati, Ohio the informal Excelsior Townball Club was formed in 1860; the players were young schoolteachers and their friends, and hospital interns. Reportedly they used a small bat which was swung with one hand, in games of four innings, with 10 to 15 players on a side. The more formal Cincinnati Buckeye Townball Club was established in 1863.
- Indiana Author Edward Eggleston remembers a pre-Civil War schoolyard game:
  Town-ball is one of the old games from which the scientific but not half so amusing "national game" of base-ball has since been evolved. In that day the national game was not thought of. Eastern boys played field-base, and Western boys town-ball in a free and happy way, with soft balls, primitive bats, and no nonsense. There were no scores, but a catch or a cross-out in town-ball put the whole side out, leaving others to take the bat or "paddle" as it was appropriately called.
  — Scribner's Monthly, March 1879
- The town of Canton, Illinois was incorporated in 1837. At the first meeting of the town trustees (aldermen), March 27, 1837, Section 36 of the Ordinances was enacted: "any person who shall on the Sabbath day play at bandy, cricket, cat, town-ball, corner-ball, over-ball, fives, or any other game of ball, within the limits of the corporation, or shall engage in pitching dollars or quarters, or any other game, in any public place, shall, on conviction thereof, be fined the sum of one dollar."
- Henry J. Philpott described himself as "a pupil and teacher in country schools within twenty miles of the Mississippi River, and about half-way between St. Louis and St. Paul." He wrote a story called "A Little Boys' Game with a Ball" for Popular Science Monthly in 1890. Philpott writes that the boys played Old Cat until they had more than eight players; then they switched to town-ball. "In 'town-ball' there was as yet no distinction between base-men [infielders] and fielders. After the pitcher and catcher had been selected, the others on that side went where they pleased; and they did not get to bat until they had put all the batters out." He writes that after baseball was introduced, town-ball "was so different that for some years the two games were played side by side, each retaining its own name."

== The Massachusetts Game ==
New Englanders usually called their game "base" or "round ball" (from running 'round the bases). The "Massachusetts game" or "New England game" was a formalized version with many clubs active in the Boston area. A set of rules was drawn up by the Massachusetts Association of Base Ball Players at Dedham, Massachusetts in 1858. This game was played by ten to fourteen players with four bases 60 feet apart and no foul territory. The ball was considerably smaller and lighter than a modern baseball, and runners were put out by "soaking"—hitting them with the thrown ball. Innings were one-out, all-out and the first club to reach 100 runs was the winner. Although it had its adherents until the 1860s, the Massachusetts game was superseded by the three-out, all-out "New York game" of baseball, with its Knickerbocker Rules which formed the basis of the modern game of baseball.

== Old-fashioned base ball ==
Another term applied retroactively to precursor baseball games was "old-fashioned base ball". This game was generally identified as a type of baseball with large numbers on each side, where the fielders threw the ball at the runner. The Knickerbocker Antiquarian Base Ball Club of Newark, New Jersey continued to play old-fashioned baseball at least until 1865. After the Civil War, old-timers still put on exhibitions of traditional baseball at picnics and charity events. For instance, in Mauston, Wisconsin in 1888, the festivities at The Old Settlers Jubilee included "an old-fashioned base ball game." Ironically, the only mention of baseball in The Chronicles of Cooperstown describes an old-fashioned game:

1877. A famous game of old-fashioned base ball was played here, in August—Judge Sturges heading the "Reds" and Judge Edick the "Blues"—16 on a side. The victory was with the "Blues." It called together a large concourse of people.

Many articles were written waxing nostalgically for the old game. This nostalgia was satirized by Robert J. Burdette in his story "Rollo Learning to Play":

And town ball, he said, good old town ball! There was no limit to the number on a side. The ring was anywhere from three hundred feet to a mile in circumference, according to whether we played on a vacant Pingree lot or out on the open prairie. ... The bat was a board, about the general shape of a Roman galley oar and not quite so wide as a barn door. The ball was of solid India rubber; a little fellow could hit it a hundred yards, and a big boy, with a hickory club, could send it clear over the bluffs or across the lake. We broke all the windows in the school-house the first day, and finished up every pane of glass in the neighborhood before the season closed. The side that got its innings first kept them until school was out or the last boy died.

— The Wit and Humor of America, Vol. 5 1907

Varieties of town ball remained a popular schoolyard activity, especially in rural areas, well into the 20th century. In recent times the Massachusetts Rules have occasionally been used by "vintage" baseball clubs, such as the Leatherstocking Base Ball Club of Cooperstown, New York.

== Notable town ball players ==
=== Abraham Lincoln ===
According to Lincoln biographer Albert Beveridge, "He joined with gusto in outdoor sports—foot-races, jumping and hopping contests, town ball, wrestling."

=== Ty Cobb ===
In his book My Life in Baseball, Ty Cobb wrote about ballplaying in Georgia around 1898: "At eleven and twelve, I liked to play cow-pasture baseball—what we called town ball." He wrote of whacking a string ball and "then chasing madly about the bases while an opponent tried to retrieve said pill [sic] and sock you with it." In this version of town ball, a home run entitled the hitter to another turn at bat.

== See also ==
- Origins of baseball
