= Sandlot ball =

Variant of baseball

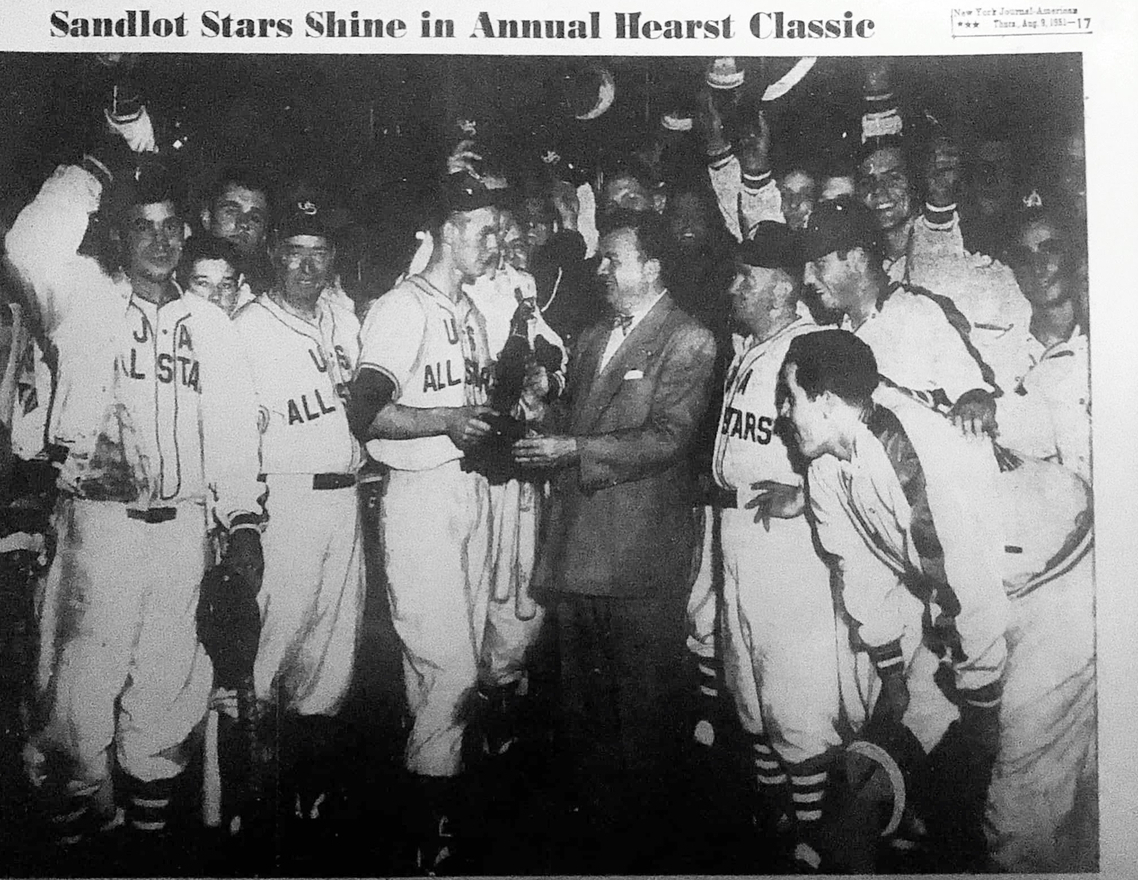
Future Hall of Fame outfielder Al Kaline (center, accepting the trophy) with his sandlot baseball team

Sandlot ball or sandlot baseball is a competitive and athletic sports game that follows the basic rules and procedures of baseball. It is less organized and structured, as the name alludes to a makeshift field or an empty lot. In the 20th century, it was one of the most popular forms of recreation for children in the United States and many Caribbean and Central American countries.

== History and origins ==
The term "sandlot" traces its origins back to the 1870s, emerging in the city of San Francisco as an in-town park and empty lot that served as a versatile venue for various sports. It refers to the makeshift field, which could be nothing more than an empty piece of land in the area composed of grass, dirt, or sand that is big enough to host the game. Objects used in playing the game can be improvised to take the place of bases, balls, or bats if they are unavailable.

Despite the evolving culture surrounding sandlot baseball over the years, the tradition has persisted into the 2020s. Sandlot baseball teams, a nostalgic relic of the past, continue to exist, with at least 110 teams since 2006, and notably, 21 teams formed as recently as 2022.

Specific rules can be set for games and may vary each time the game is played. These rules are usually agreed upon before the game begins by teams of young children, usually residents of the same neighborhood.

As of 2024, there is evidence that sandlot ball continues to be played in neighborhoods in Minneapolis, MN, Corry, PA, Clearfield, PA, Ringgold, GA, and Southern Pines, NC.

== Competition ==
Sandlot baseball may create opportunities for children to enjoy a competitive experience and enhance competition where there is extensive action, personal involvement, and close scores.

It encourages players to think outside-of-the-box and think critically when there aren't enough players. It allows them to learn negotiation skills when deciding if a pitch was a strike or a ball, if a player was safe or out, or when a ball was fair or foul. It teaches them how to get along with one another, and permits them to work on organizational skills.

== Benefits ==
The benefits of unorganized, free-play that can be found in sandlot ball include intellectual, social, emotional, and physical development. In Minneapolis, Minnesota, a local Principal, Christian Alberto Ledesma, noting that kids need to feel connected following recent events, launched Minneapolis Sandlot Ball. "The world is a lot right now," he said. "And kids need to have fun. And kids need to connect. And not just the kids, because you see the parents wanting to connect, too, and have a good time."

“The fundamentals of baseball must be practiced continually, even at the big league level,” says Doug Weiskopf in an article on ESPN.com titled Sandlot going the way of the Wooden Bat. “The lack of pickup games and sandlot ball today has hurt the development of young players.”

“Since they are not playing enough catch, the throwing skills of young children have diminished,” Weiskopf said. “They need to make playing catch fun and challenging. Young players need more skill-based, fun-resulting experiences, as opposed to high-pressurized organized league play.”

The organizational and negotiation skills developed in unorganized games are also important. Kids develop skills as they determine if something is a ball or a strike, batting order, who plays where, if the ball is fair or foul, if the runner is safe or out. They also learn how to make equitable teams and make the game more inclusive.

== Media ==
Sandlot ball is as well-known and widespread as it is today because of the influence of media and the film industry.

A film titled The Sandlot was released in 1993. A coming-of-age comedy set in the 1960s, the film follows a rag-tag group of pre-teen boys growing up in California. These boys spend their days playing baseball on a sandlot and finding themselves in a variety of adventures and mishaps. The film follows narrator and main character Scotty Smalls who is new in town. At first he is turned-down by this local group of boys whose lives wholeheartedly revolve around the sport, but as his knowledge of sandlot ball grows he begins to assimilate into the group well.

== See also ==
- Corkball
- Half-rubber
- Scrub baseball
- Stickball
