= Backboard (basketball) =

Piece of basketball equipment

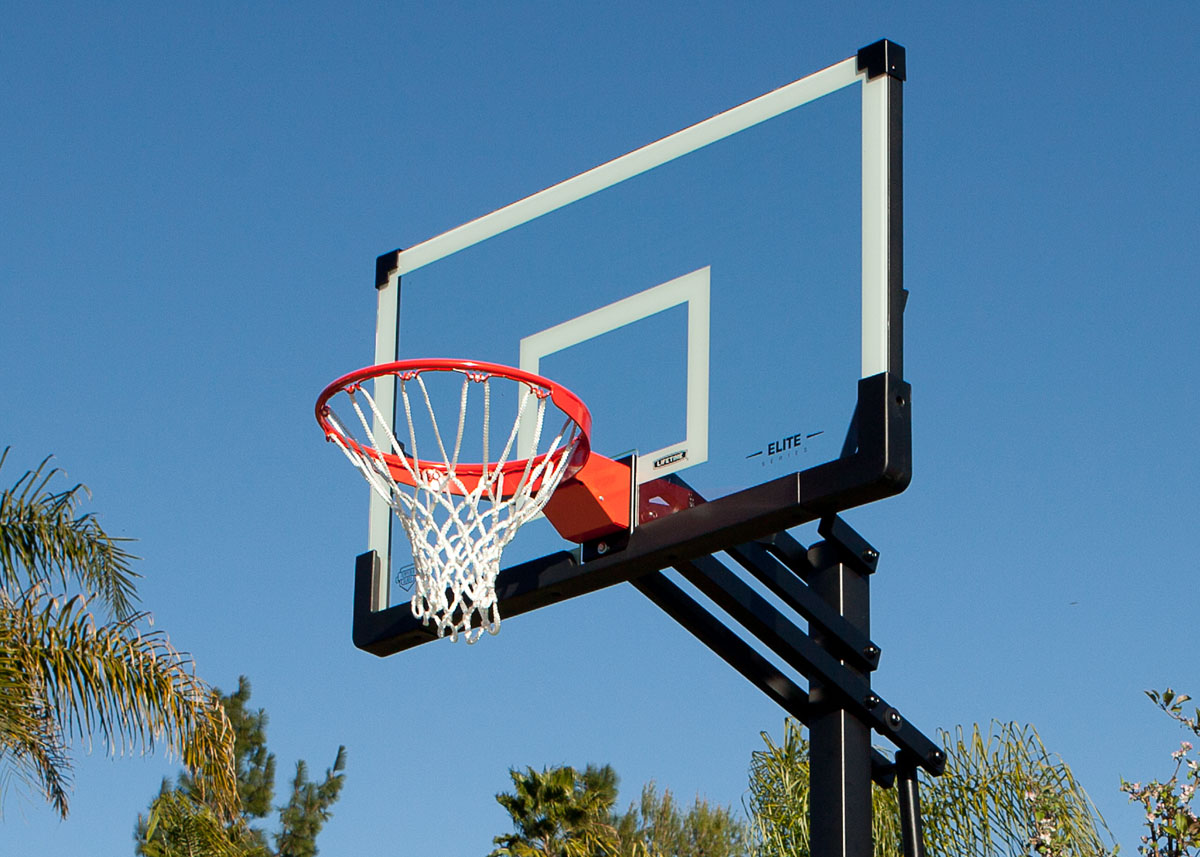
A basketball backboard with a rim attached

A backboard is a piece of basketball equipment. It is a raised vertical board with an attached basket consisting of a net suspended from a hoop. It is made of a flat, rigid piece of, often Plexiglas or tempered glass which also has the properties of safety glass when accidentally shattered. It is usually rectangular as used in NBA, NCAA and international basketball. In recreational environments, a backboard may be oval or a fan-shape, particularly in non-professional games.

The top of the hoop is 10 feet (3.05 m) above the ground. Regulation backboards are 6 feet (1.83 m) wide by 3.5 feet (1.07 m) tall. All basketball rims (hoops) are 18 inches (46 cm) in diameter. The inner rectangle on the backboard is 24 inches (61 cm) wide by 18 inches (46 cm) tall, and helps a shooter determine the proper aim and banking for either a layup or distance shot.

In addition to those markings and those of its manufacturer, leagues and governing bodies often place other decals on the edge of the backboard on the glass, including the logo of the league or organization, and a national flag. On top of the backboard, a league or team's web address or sponsor logo is affixed to take advantage of the high television camera angle utilized for instant replay of slam dunks and other shots above the rim.

In professional and most higher college settings, the backboard is part of a portable wheeled stanchion that can be moved out of the way and stored to allow the venue to host multiple other sports and events, though in most high schools and examples such as Stanford University's Maples Pavilion and Cameron Indoor Stadium at Duke University, backboards are mounted as part of a suspended system using the venue's ceiling joists to support the goal and allow them to be put out of the way in the ceiling support system via a system of pulleys when not in use, along with the more common wall-mounted system. Practice or gym class-utilized sideline backboards are generally of the permanently wall-mounted variety, and usually have opaque fiberglass or thick metal boards instead, along with most outdoor municipal park boards.

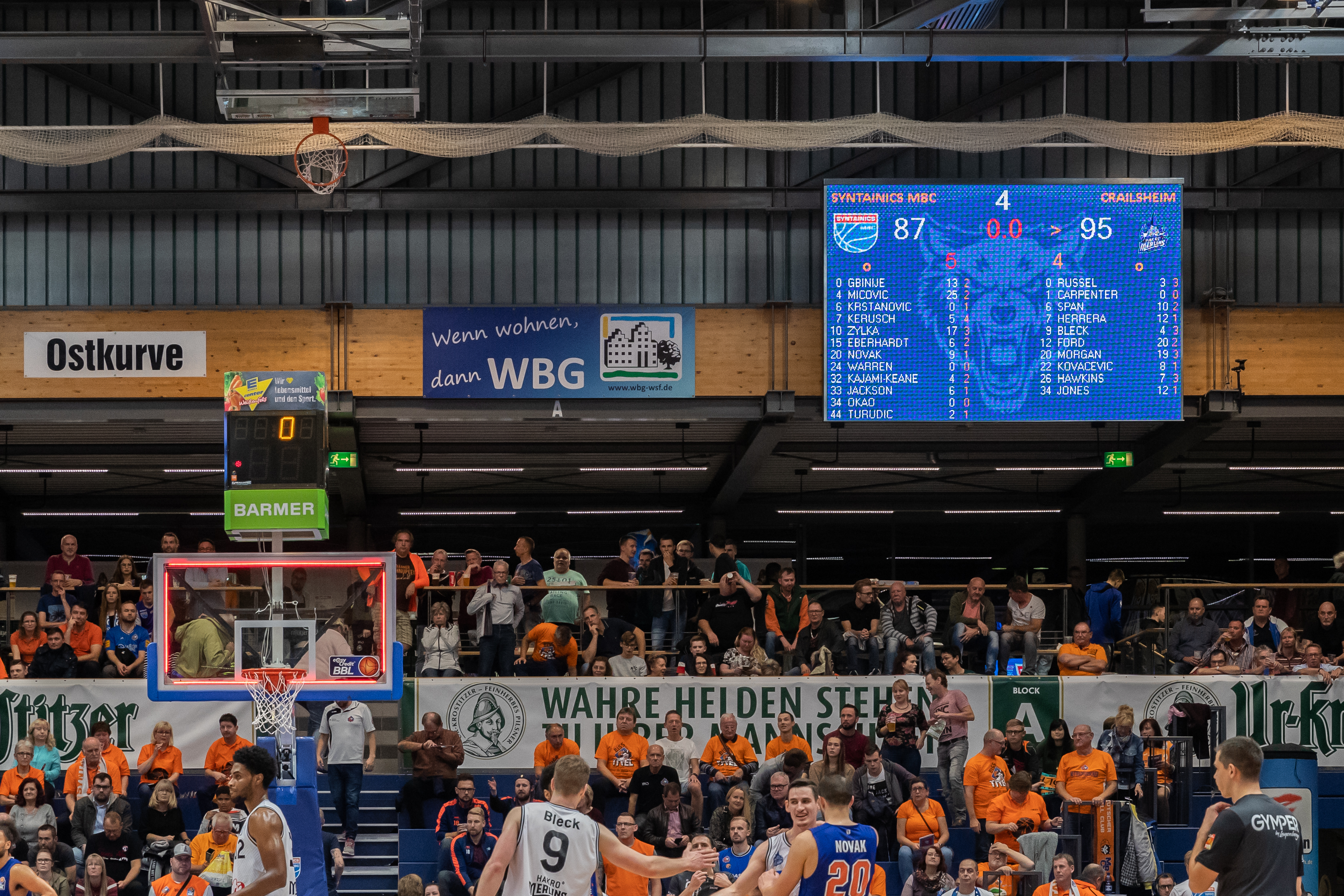
An Official basketball backboard with a neon buzzer light built in

In intervening years, the portable stanchion containing the backboard has also taken on cabling and sensors within its core, along with the structure of a game clock and shot clock above it, which makes the setup of one as involved as an arena's basketball floor, to the point of requiring a replacement backboard being on standby if it and/or the rim is ever taken out of level or broken.

Professional glass backboards used to break from 625 pounds (283 kg) of force or more. Modern professional and higher-level college play backboards do not have the glass absorbing any weight to avoid breaking the glass and backboard as a whole.
