= Basket (basketball) =

Basketball equipment hanging from the backboard

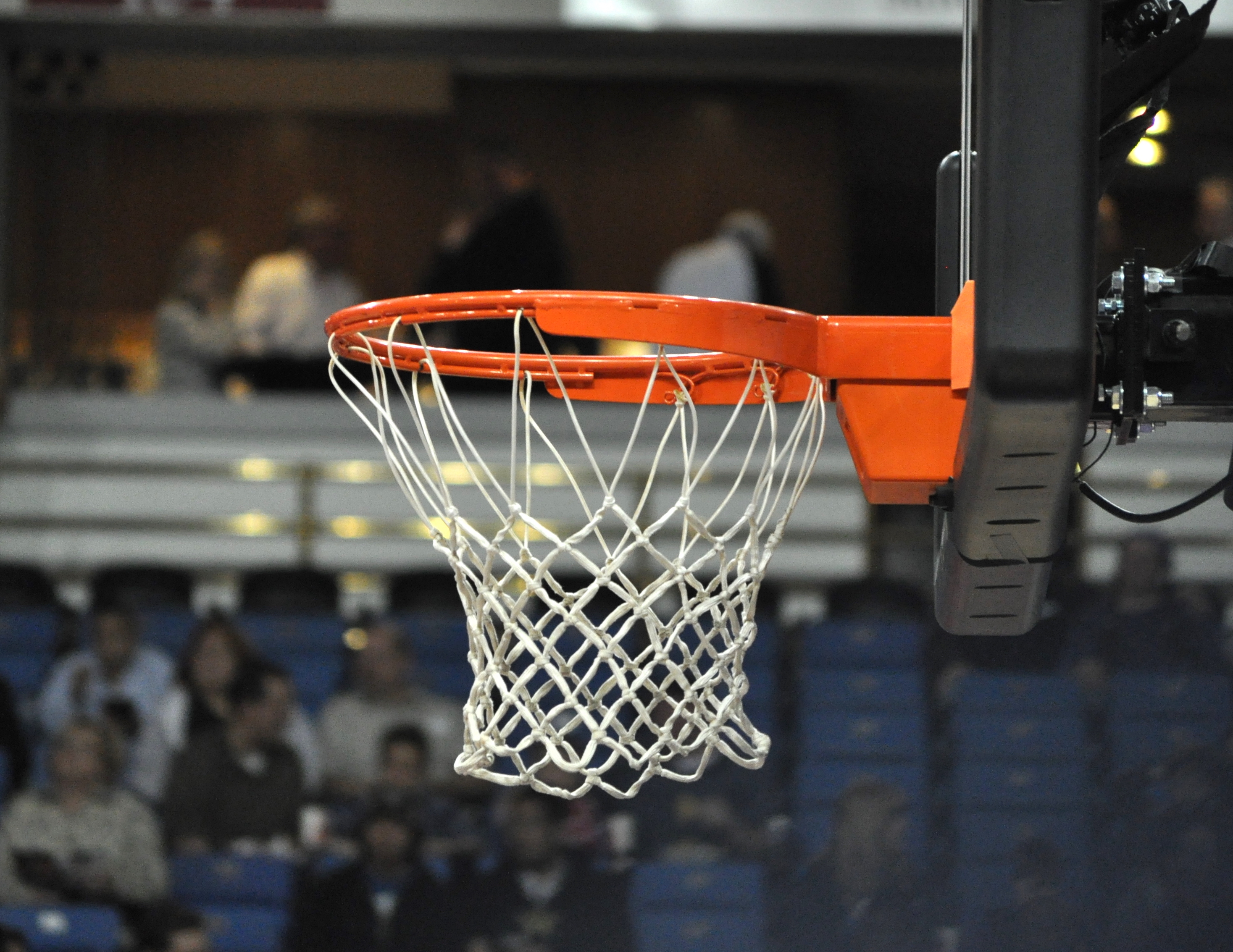
Typical professional hoop (left) with backboard (right)

The basket or hoop is a piece of basketball equipment, consisting of the rim and net. It hangs from the backboard. The first basket was a peach basket installed by James Naismith. The bottom was eventually cut out of the basket, and the basket was eventually replaced with the metal rim and net. Today there are breakaway rims.

A field goal is a shot that goes through the basket.

== Rim ==
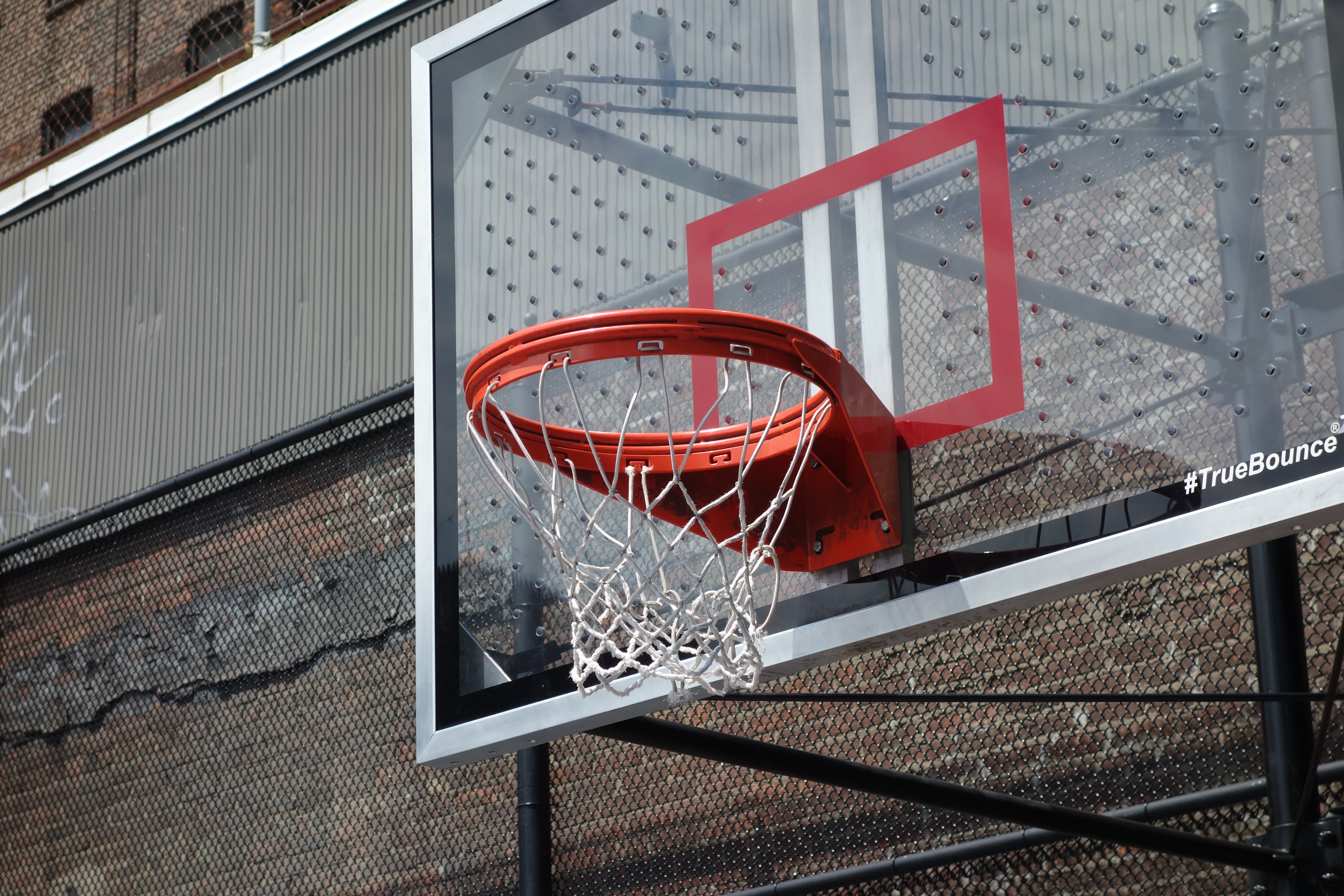
Typical professional hoop with backboard and net

A rim, hoop, or basket ring is a piece of basketball equipment in the form of a circular metal ring that supports the net. It hangs from the backboard. A professional rim has a diameter of the 18 inches (460 mm). A slam dunk requires one to jump high enough to get his hand above or over the rim. Today there are breakaway rims.

=== FIBA's technical specifications ===
Specifications of FIBA:

- The vertical distance from the basketball court floor to the center of the rim allowed to be 3,050 ± 6 millimeters. (Note: ≈120.079 ± ≈0.236 inches)
- The vertical distance from the center of the rim to the bottom of the suspended net allowed to be from 400 millimetres (16 in) to 450 millimetres (18 in).
- The vertical distance from the center of the rim to the bottom of the backboard allowed to be from 148 millimetres (5.8 in) to 150 millimetres (5.9 in).
- The vertical distance from the basketball rim to the backboard allowed to be 151 ± 2 millimeters. (Note: ≈5.945 ± ≈0.079 inches)
- The thickness of the basketball ring's metal allowed to be from 16 millimetres (0.63 in) to 20 millimetres (0.79 in).
- The inner diameter of the basketball hoop allowed to be from 450 millimetres (18 in) to 459 millimetres (18.1 in).

=== NBA's technical specifications ===
In the NBA, the rim is a metal ring with an interior diameter of exactly 18 inches (46 cm) that has pressure-release mechanism. It is painted orange. The rim's upper edge is positioned exactly 10 feet (3.0 m) from the floor and its closest part to the backboard has a distance of 6 inches (15 cm) from it.

== Bibliography ==
- FIBA (Fédération Internationale de Basketball Amateur). 2024. Official Basketball Rules 2024: Basketball Equipment. Approved by FIBA Central Board. PDF.
- Graubart, Norman D. 2015. The Science of Basketball. The Rosen Publishing Group. ISBN 978-1-4994-1129-4.
- Martindale Jr., Wight. 2005. Inside the Cage: A Season at West 4th Street's Legendary Tournament. Simon and Schuster. ISBN 978-1-4169-0539-4.
- NBA (National Basketball Association). 2024. 2024–25 Official NBA Playing Rules. PDF.
