= Nationalism and sport =

Nationalism and sport are often intertwined, as sports provide a venue for symbolic competition between nations; sports competition often reflects national conflict, and in fact has often been a tool of diplomacy. The involvement of political goals in sport is seen by some as contrary to the fundamental ethos of sport being carried on for its own sake, for the enjoyment of its participants, but this involvement has been true throughout the history of sport.

It has been found that sporting nationalism is most strongly found in countries with less development and globalization, with higher levels of education correlated with weaker nationalism.

== Sports diplomacy ==
Most sports are contested between national teams, which encourages the use of sporting events for nationalist purposes, whether intentionally or not. The signalling of national solidarity through sport is one of the primary forms of banal nationalism.

Several sporting events are a matter of national pride; The Ashes is a matter of national pride between England and Australia. Also in cricket an India versus Pakistan match puts both countries on a virtual standstill as if it were all about national pride during those matches.

The Olympic Games are the premier stage for nationalist competition, and its history reflects the history of political conflict since its inception at the end of the 19th century. The 1936 Summer Olympics held in Berlin was an illustration, maybe best acknowledged in hindsight, where an ideology was developing which used the event to strengthen its spread through propaganda. The boycott by the United States and politically aligned nations of the 1980 Summer Olympics and the Soviet Union and politically aligned nations of the 1984 Summer Olympics were part of the Cold War conflict.

When apartheid was the official policy in South Africa, many sportspeople adopted the conscientious approach that they should not appear in competitive sports there. Some feel this was an effective contribution to the eventual demolition of the policy of apartheid, others feel that it may have prolonged and reinforced its worst effects. Many African nations boycotted the 1976 Summer Olympics in Montreal, as a result of then New Zealand Prime Minister Robert Muldoon allowing the All Blacks to tour South Africa. The issue would later come to a head during the 1981 Springbok Tour.

George Orwell's essay "The Sporting Spirit" examines the effect nationalism plays on sport, where Orwell argues that various sporting events trigger violence between groups for the very reason of competition.

== Government investment and national identity ==
Governments have used public investment in elite sport as a means of promoting national identity and increasing international prestige. Such policies can include funding national teams, developing high-performance training programmes and supporting participation in major international competitions. Researchers Jonathan Grix and Fiona Carmichael have examined how governments justify these investments through the expectation that international sporting success will strengthen national pride, encourage public participation in sport and improve a country's international reputation.

However, the relationship between sporting success and national identity remains contested. A systematic review of 85 peer-reviewed studies found no consistent evidence that elite sporting success produces lasting increases in national identity or international prestige. The researchers concluded that any positive effects were generally limited or temporary and depended on factors including political circumstances, public interest and emotional involvement in sporting events.

== Nationalistic sports ==
In the history of Ireland, Gaelic sports were clearly carried on with nationalist overtones: for example, for most of the last century a person could have been banned from playing Gaelic football, hurling, or other sport, if the person was seen to have played Association football, cricket, rugby or any other game which was of British origin.

The nationalistic Italian fascists also created Volata as their own home-grown alternative to football and rugby. It was intended to be a replacement for the popular games perceived to be of British origin that would be of a more local character, tracing its heritage back to the earlier Italian games of Harpastum and Calcio Fiorentino. However, unlike its Gaelic equivalents, Volata was short-lived and is no longer played.

== Clubs as symbols of rival communities ==
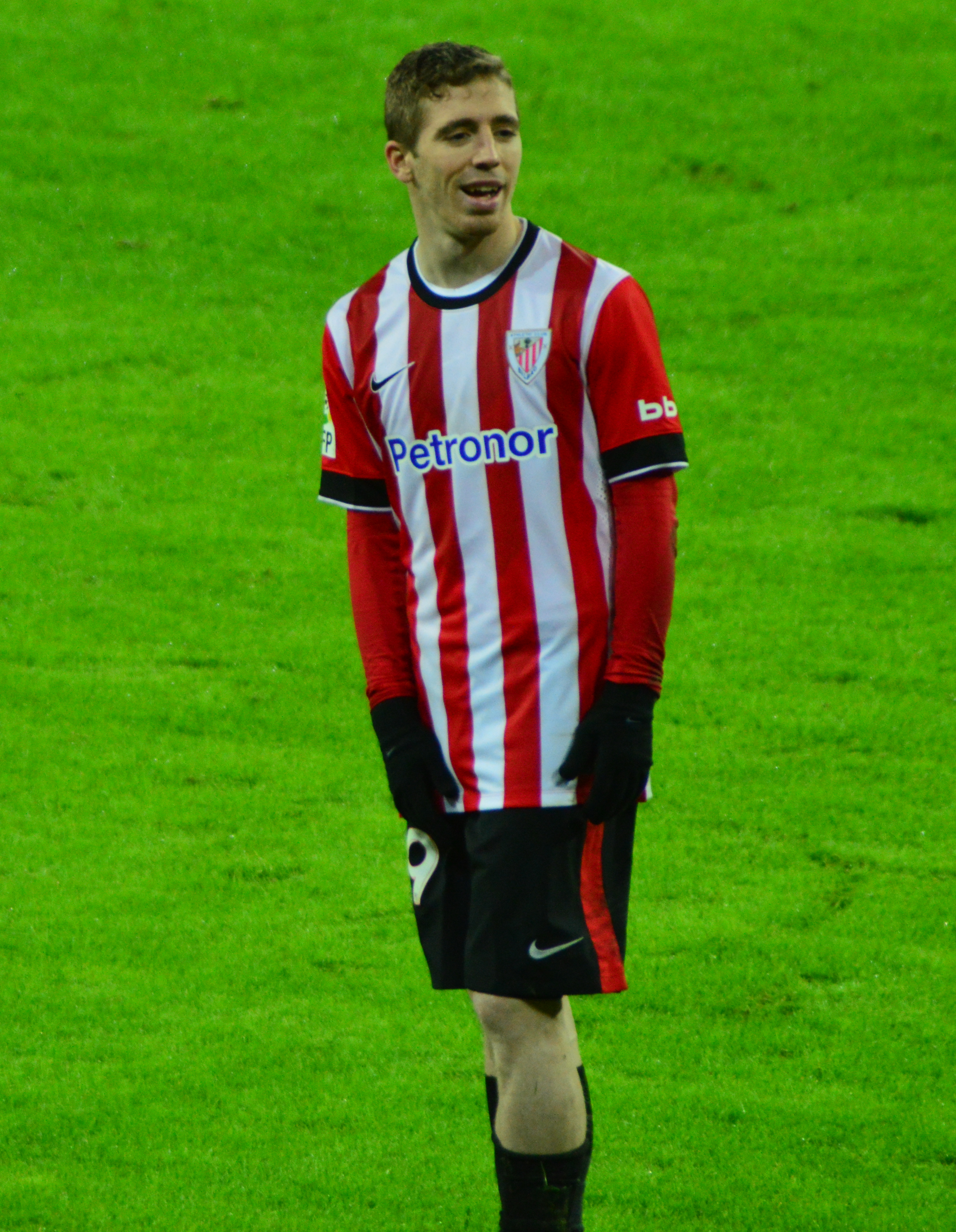
Athletic Bilbao only field Basque footballers, such as Iker Muniain.

In Scotland, the Old Firm derby in Glasgow featuring Celtic, historically linked to the city's Catholic community, and Rangers, similarly linked to the city's Protestant community, have also historically seen trends along ethno-political lines.

The policy of Spanish football team Athletic Bilbao of picking only Basque players is strongly linked to Basque nationalism. This causes disputes between Athletic Bilbao and other Basque teams due to the Bilbao squad being able to use their economic power to purchase players who play for other important Basque teams who have strong youth ranks, such as CA Osasuna and Real Sociedad. In the same vein, FC Barcelona have since the late 1990s promoted from youth ranks a series of Catalan players such as Xavi and Carles Puyol. Indeed, the club is widely seen as the de facto representative of Catalonia, extending the Autonomous Community's reach to areas it otherwise would not be able to influence. However, their local rivals RCD Espanyol usually field more Catalan players than FC Barcelona and the best Catalan goalscorer in La Liga history Raúl Tamudo came through their youth ranks.

In Yugoslavia, NK Dinamo Zagreb and Red Star Belgrade were seen as symbols of Croatian and Serbian nationalism, respectively. On 13 May 1990, due to the rise of nationalism in the wake of the breakup of the country, an infamous riot broke out between the clubs' ultras during a league game in Zagreb.

In Canada, the Montreal Canadiens, the world's oldest and most successful professional ice hockey team, has always been a symbol for Francophone Quebeckers in Montreal. The teams has had rivalries in succession with the Anglophone Quebec's Montreal Wanderers and Montreal Maroons, as well as English Canada's Toronto Maple Leafs. As well, from 1975 to 1995 there was a rivalry with the Quebec Nordiques from Quebec City, which took on political overtones, with Canadiens fans being more likely to be Liberals and federalists, and Nordiques fans more likely Pequists and sovereigntists.

=== Indonesian clubs ===
In Indonesia, one of the most successful clubs in Indonesian football Persipura Jayapura is considered to represent Papuan identity and it could be said to be one of the symbols of the campaign and struggle for Papuan independence. In several matches, the flag of the Republic of West Papua, which is considered separatist by the Indonesian government, was flown several times. In fact, one of the players, Edward Junior Wilson, who comes from Liberia, was involved in a fight with the Indonesian police because they thought he was flying the West Papua flag. This happened in the deciding match 2016 Indonesia Soccer Championship A at Mandala Stadium, Jayapura on 18 December 2016. At that time, Persipura, who managed to become champion after beating PSM Makassar 4–2, celebrated their victory after the match. Edward also raised the national flag of Liberia; however, because it was raining at the time, the police mistook the flag he was flying and there was a flag-pulling action with him. After the incident, the police revealed the misunderstanding that had occurred. This incident also sparked a riot between fans and police at the stadium.

For some Acehnese, Persiraja Banda Aceh is also considered to represent their Acehnese identity and the Free Aceh Movement. In other cases, Persib Bandung is considered to represent the identity of Sundanese and West Java, especially the Priangan area and by some people it has been considered as their Sundanese culture. By critical people, Persib is analogous to a symbol of resistance to Indonesian centrism which focuses on Jakarta (this is also related to its rivalry with Persija Jakarta). Persib is also considered "the national team of Bandung people", in fact the level of attendance at the stadium for Persib is higher than for the Indonesia national team when they play in Bandung. Low audience attendance for the Indonesian national team in Bandung this is also the background by sweeping actions and abuse carried out by rival supporters, The Jakmania against Bobotoh (the name for Persib supporters) when the Indonesian national team played in Jakarta, one of them was the attack on the capo of the Indonesian national team, who was also a Bobotoh on 28 October 2018 at Gelora Bung Karno Main Stadium by 30 to 50 The Jakmania members. In 2022, a video showed the removal of a banner supporting the Indonesian national team at Sidolig Stadium in Bandung. In the video, the man who carried out the takedown said to the video viewer in Sundanese and English "Eweuh timnas, this is Persib!" ("There is no national team, this is Persib!"). This incident occurred during Indonesian national team training at the stadium.

== By country ==
=== Canada ===
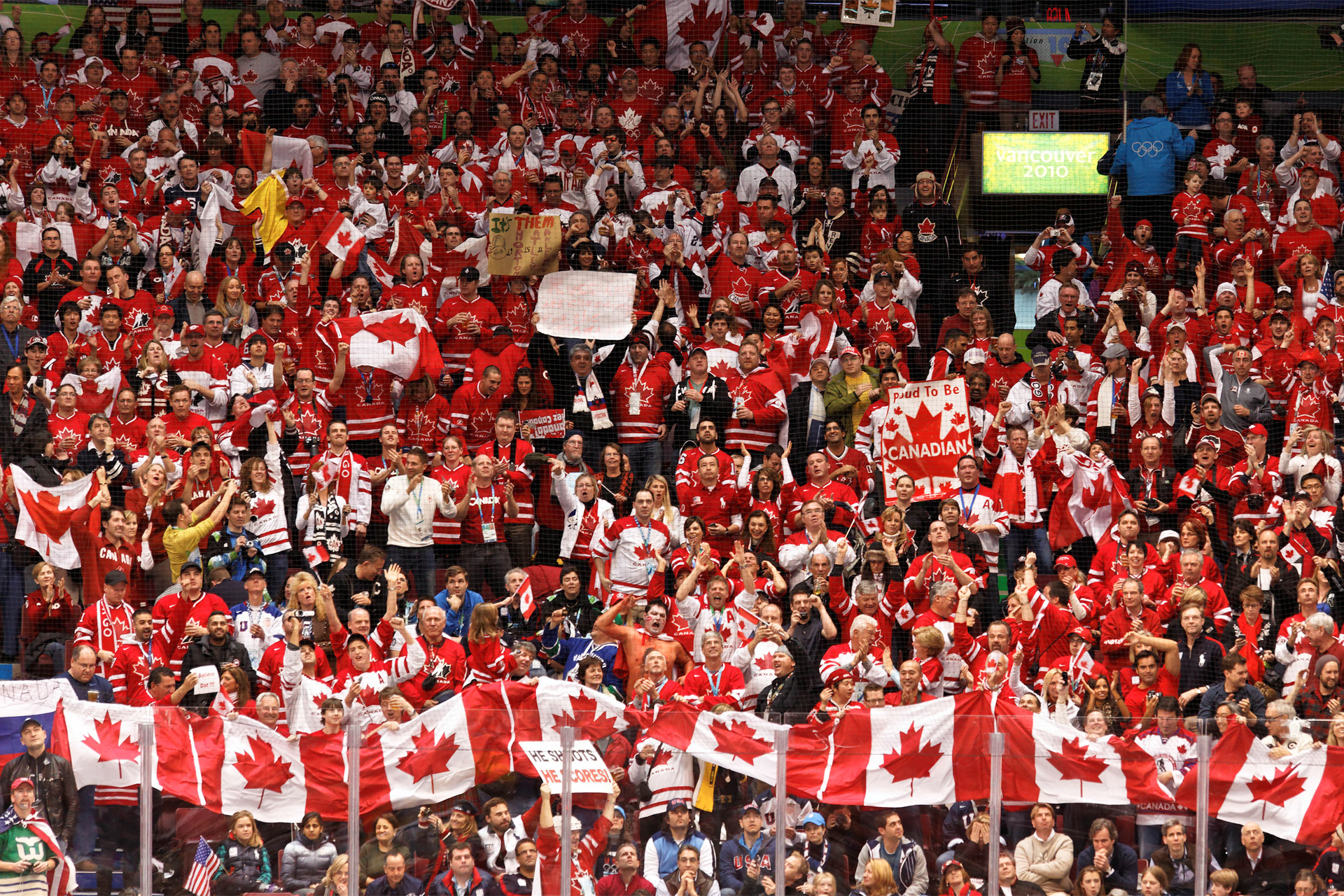
Canadians during a 2010 Winter Olympics gold medal match against the United States

Having been part of the British Empire, Canadians initially attempted to maintain sporting relations with the Anglo-Saxon world. However, over time they became more attracted to North American sports, which they considered less exclusionary, and they pursued a greater autonomy through sporting nationalism after World War I.

Ice hockey, as the biggest sport in Canada, plays a significant role in unifying the nation. However, Professor Bruce Kidd argues that there is a cultural ambiguity to the way that Canadian nationalism is expressed through the sport, since the National Hockey League, which started in Canada, is primarily supported by the American market. The increasing Americanization of Canadian sport, visible since the 1960s, has been resisted in various ways, such as by the government restricting American involvement in the Canadian Football League. Entering the 21st century, the government has prioritized funding for high-level performance at the international level over grassroots sport, citing the importance of international victories in nation-building.

=== Cuba ===
Baseball played a significant role in allowing colonial Cuba to assert its independence and uniqueness relative to Spain. After independence, baseball factored into Cuba's relations with the neighboring United States.

=== India ===
==== British India ====
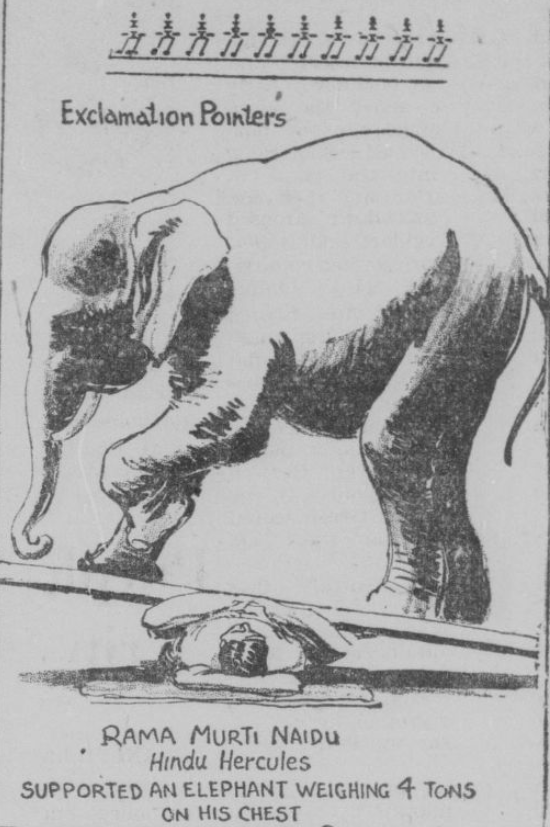
Kodi Rammurthy Naidu lifting an elephant; his strongman efforts were meant to counter British accusations of Indian effeteness

Unsurprisingly, the native Indians were not keen on giving up their traditions to follow their colonizers, as author Subhadipa Dutta emphasizes through the quote of “the colonized were not always fascinated to ‘mimic’ the manly gestures and leisure pursuits of their white masters.” To illustrate this, in his book, Ramachandra Guha has delved deep into the political aspect of religion, race and caste within sports teams, especially cricket. Guha successfully highlights the significance of the socio-cultural factors that are entwined in cricket, and how it encouraged the indigenization of the sport. Cricket came to be seen as a unifying way to demonstrate resistance and success against the colonisers and helped in reducing various forms of societal discrimination, with tours to the United Kingdom starting in 1911 displaying aspects of Indian progress and international diplomacy. The Indian Social Reformer argued in 1906, after an Indian victory over a European side in the Bombay Presidency powered by chamar (low-caste) cricketers, who earlier had not been allowed to even dine with their teammates, that the occasion was "a landmark in the nation’s emancipation from the old disuniting and denationalizing customs."

Meanwhile, football came to be seen as an equalising game that cut across class lines and united the global anti-imperialist struggle in left-wing regions such as Kerala and West Bengal. British accusations of Indian effeminacy, which enabled them to demonstrate superiority and powered their programs to reshape local practices, were resisted in a variety of ways, with success against British teams seen as contributing to national revival.

==== Postcolonial India ====
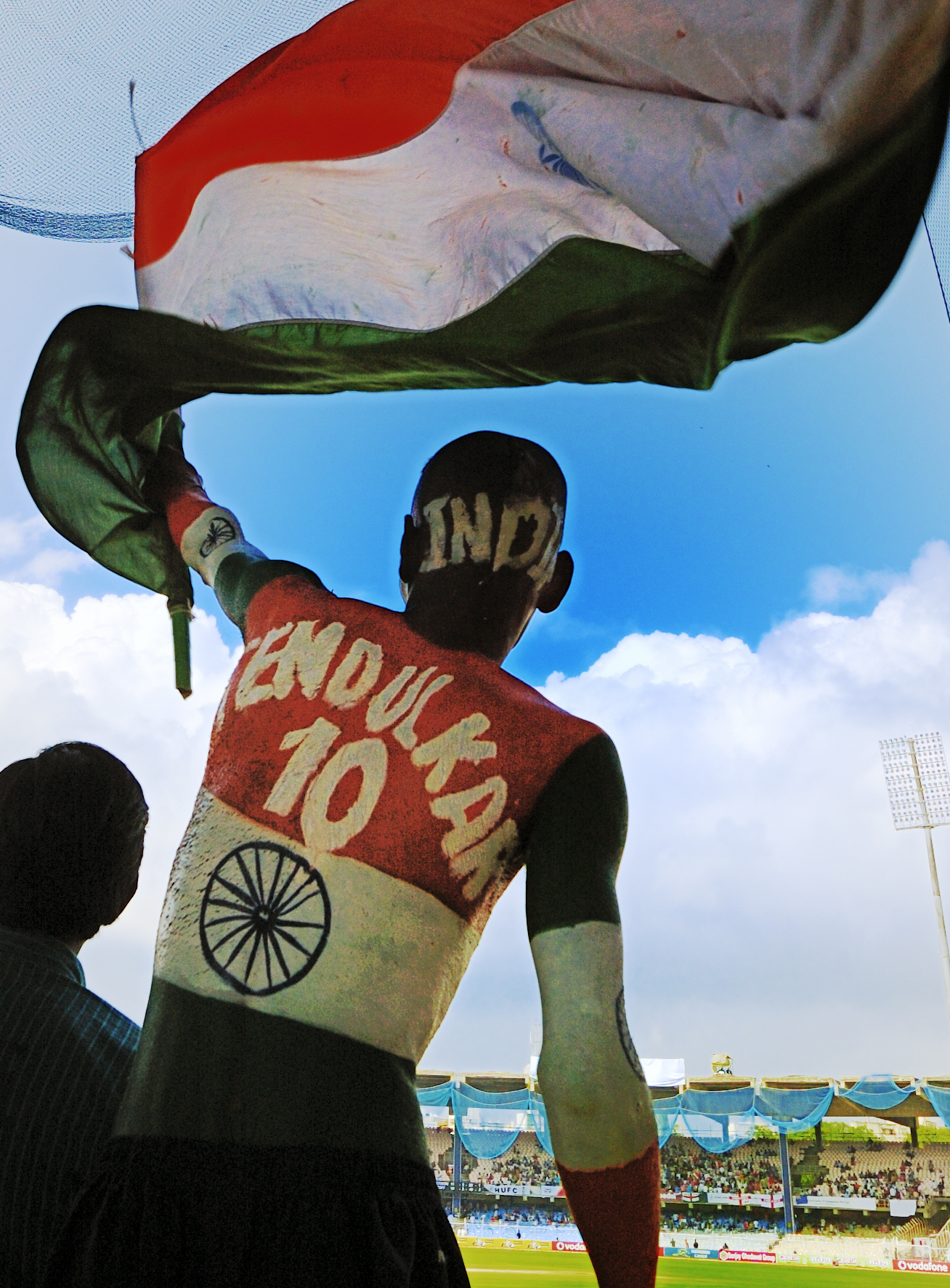
A supporter of the Indian cricket team

In the 1948 Summer Olympics, one year after independence, India's hockey team defeated the British team 4–0 in London's Empire Stadium. Describing his feelings after winning the match, Balbir Singh Sr. later explained: "The Tiranga rose up slowly. With our National Anthem being played, my freedom-fighter father’s words ‘Our Flag, Our Country’ came flooding back. I finally understood what he meant. I felt (I was) rising off the ground alongside the fluttering Tiranga."

By the 1990s, the colonially introduced sport of cricket became identified with the nation's sporting success and economic growth, with stars like Sachin Tendulkar gaining fame and channeling national aspirations. In some cases, Indian supporters of Pakistan's cricket team are jailed after India–Pakistan matches.

The ancient physical culture and traditional games of India, such as kabaddi and kho kho, have sometimes been identified as part of a project of Hindu nationalism, as supported by the Rashtriya Swayamsevak Sangh (RSS), to bolster national rejuvenation through physical and cultural strengthening.

=== United States ===
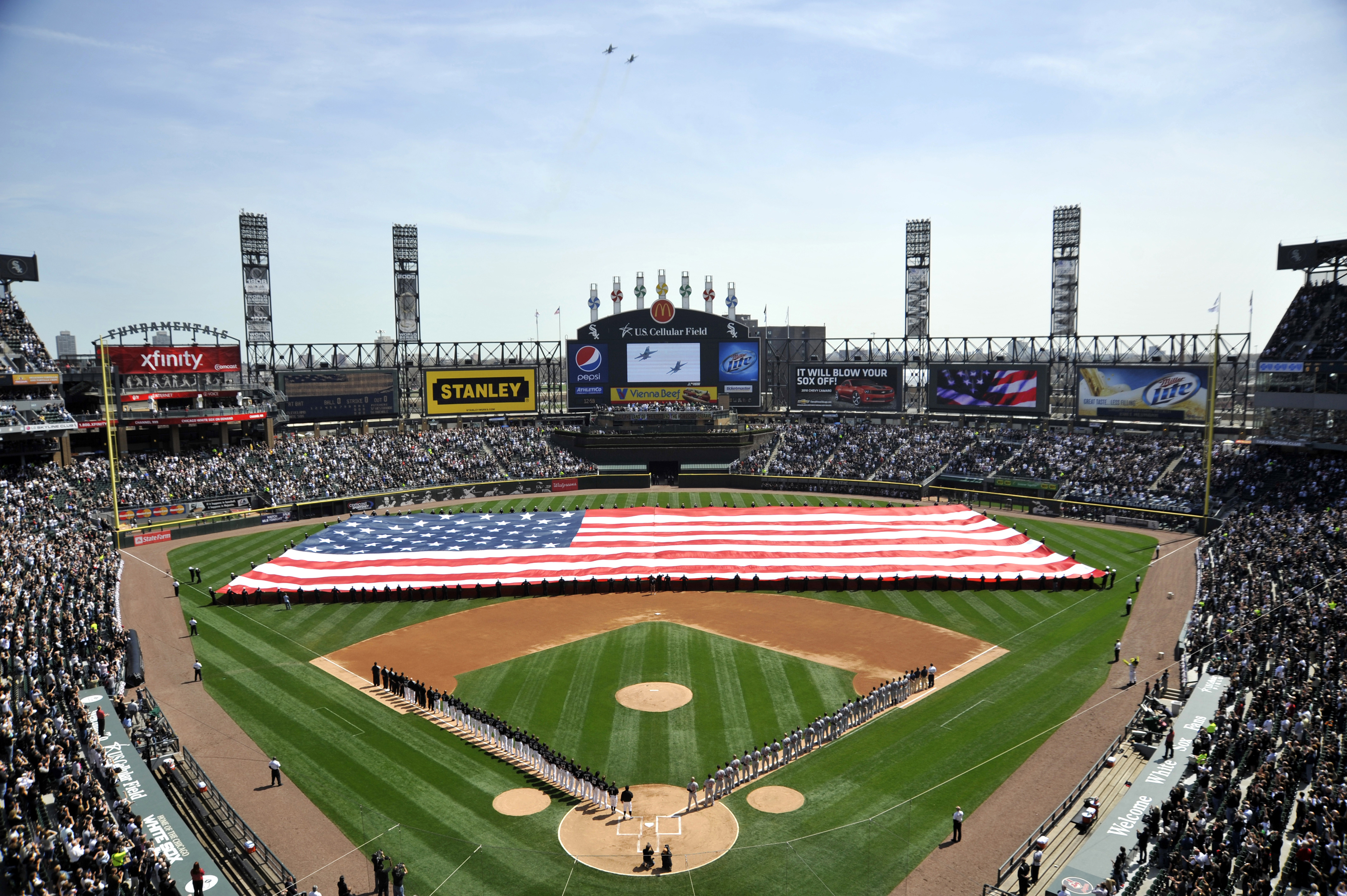
Large American flag at an MLB game

American sporting traditions, many of which were consolidated around the late 19th century, have become an enduring part of symbolizing and expanding the nation's unity. During the 1860s Civil War, baseball became the national pastime and helped to reunify the country in the war's aftermath. In 1910, the ceremonial first pitch by the President was initiated, furthering baseball's national role. Sports like baseball as well as supporting ideologies such as Muscular Christianity also played a role in defining and shaping the imperial encounter with the world, which was accompanied by sentiments of American exceptionalism.

Since a surge of patriotism bolstered by the World Wars, the national anthem is now always played before games. From the late 20th century onward, the National Football League (NFL) and its violent, military-associated characteristics have played a significant role in shaping the American identity, with the game's disproportionate involvement of African American athletes contributing to feelings of equal opportunity and interracial unity.

== Esports ==
There has been growing research on esports as a way of performing national identity and ethnicity, as well as how they act as a form of banal nationalism. In China, there has been growing support for esports in the context of cybernationalism, while Australia's traditional linkage of its sporting culture and national identity has translated to some extent into the esports world.

== See also ==
- Globalization of sports
- Legitimating ideology
- Nationalism § Sport
- Racism in sport
- Status attainment
- Us versus them
- Winner and loser culture

=== Specific sports ===
- Association football and politics
- Rugby union and apartheid

=== Specific communities ===
- Antisemitism in the Olympic Games
- Boycotts of Israel in sports
