= Scrub baseball =

Type of baseball with no teams

Scrub baseball (also called workup, because the fielders work their way up to bat) is a way of playing baseball with no teams. The number of players is variable, and score is not kept, as the idea is "each against all". Batting, pitching, and fielding are the same as in standard baseball; scrub is often used as practice for baseball, or a substitute when there aren't enough players available, between six and eleven.

The game is traditionally initiated by one person yelling, "Scrubs!" to claim the first batting position. Others quickly shout, "Scrub One!", "Scrub Two!", "Scrub Three!", etc. As the number of players available increases they are divided as follows:

Scrub Baseball
Players Available	Batting	Fielding
6	1	5
7	2	5
8	2	6
9	3	6
10	3	7
11	3	8
12	4	8
13	4	9

As in computer language, the first item - scrub - is counted as 0. When an out is made the batter moves to the highest numbered position (e.g. five = center field); five becomes four, four becomes three, three moves to two, two moves to one, and one takes a turn as batter. However, if a batted ball is caught in the air, the fielder who catches it becomes the batter.

With twelve or more players the game is generally played with two teams divided as evenly as possible. Scrub baseball is a folk game with no governing body, so the rules vary locally and from game to game, thus the table is a guide to a common method of dividing the teams. Sandlot baseball games often started as scrub games until enough players arrived to switch to team play.

If one of the two batters reaches base, he or she must run around all the bases and score during the turn of the other. This leads to much daring base-running excitement. Sometimes the batter who reaches base returns to bat again, leaving an "automatic runner" on base. Automatic (invisible or ghost) runners advance the same number of bases as the batter does, and may be forced out.

Generally the game was called workup when there were three or four players on the batting team and everyone else in the field, with four bases in use. When one of the batters makes an out he or she joins the fielding team, the pitcher joins the hitting team, and everyone moves up a position. An exception to this takes place when a fly ball is caught. In this case the fielder and the batter swap or exchange positions and the player who caught the fly ball becomes the next batter.

In another version only one base is used, as in the 19th-century game of one old cat. The base is third base. The fielding positions are center field, left field, shortstop, third base, and pitcher. Two batters work together until one makes an out and is replaced. The batter on deck acts as the catcher. If no one is covering home (both batters are running), then the runner advancing homeward can be put out by throwing the ball to the plate before the runner gets there - a practice called "crossing out".

In still another variation, a volleyball or similar ball may be used and there will be no pitcher. The "up" player sets the ball in motion by holding it in his or her non-dominant hand, and sets it in motion by a hefty strike from the other hand. This often occurs in crowded play areas, such as schoolyards, where the use of bats and baseballs is usually banned for reasons of safety.

President Warren G. Harding played scrub baseball as a boy , as did the historian Bruce Catton, and rockabilly singer Sonny Burgess .
