= Old cat =

Bat-and-ball North American game

Old cat (also known as ol' cat or cat-ball) games were bat-and-ball, safe haven games played in North America. The games were numbered according to the number of bases. The number of bases varied according to the number of players. Only one old cat continues to be commonly played in the 21st century.

One old cat, one eyed cat, or the contracted one-o'-cat was the basic version of the game, with a pitcher or giver; a batter or striker; a catcher; and sometimes another fielder or two. The striker, upon hitting the ball thrown by the giver, attempted to run to a single base (often the giver's position) and back again. The fielders tried to sting the striker-runner with a thrown ball while they were not touching the base. The striker would also be put out if the struck ball were caught in the air, or if they swung three times at the giver's deliveries and missed. One old cat, like scrub baseball, was a game of individuals—one against all—and not a team sport. Each base touched before 'out' (or just home) would score a point, although score was often not kept.

In his book Base-Ball, John Montgomery Ward wrote that to initiate a game of one old cat, players called out a number to claim a position: one, two, etc.—one being the striker, two being the pitcher, and three the catcher. When an out was made the striker moved to the last position (e.g. five), five became four, four moved to three, three moved to two, and two took a turn as striker—the coveted position. Ward said that if more players were available for the game, there would be two batters opposite each other (as in cricket), and they ran to the opposite base when the ball was hit. This was two old cat.

Three old cat had a triangular base layout and three strikers, while four old cat had four strikers and four bases in a square pattern. The Mills Commission, formed in 1905 to ascertain the origins of baseball, recorded many reminiscences of people playing three and four old cat in their youth. Baseball historian Harold Seymour reported that old cat games were still being played on the streets and vacant lots of Brooklyn in the 1920s.

Albert Spalding suggested that four old cat was the immediate ancestor of town ball, from which baseball evolved. David Block's recent research indicates that old cat games evolved alongside baseball, as informal or practice versions when there were not enough players for a full game. The Detroit Tigers used old cat as a training exercise at least as late as their 1928 spring training trip to San Antonio, Texas, under manager George Moriarity.

One old cat is seeing a resurgence as a batting and fielding training game for younger baseball and softball teams. Two games are played simultaneously on one diamond, one on the home–third line and the other on the first–second line. Because the game is faster-paced than baseball and includes position rotation as a normal element, it directly addresses the chief objection young people voice about baseball: idle time in the field or waiting to bat. The usual version is one-against-all and otherwise similar to that described above except without stinging, for safety. The game is also well played with light plastic substitute balls where space is restricted.

== See also ==
- Origins of baseball

== Sources ==
- Seymour, Harold (1989) [1960]. Baseball: The Early Years. New York: Oxford University Press. ISBN 0-19-505912-3.
- Block, David (2005). Baseball Before We Knew It: A Search for the Roots of the Game. Lincoln: University of Nebraska Press. ISBN 0-8032-1339-5.
