= Dodgeball in India =

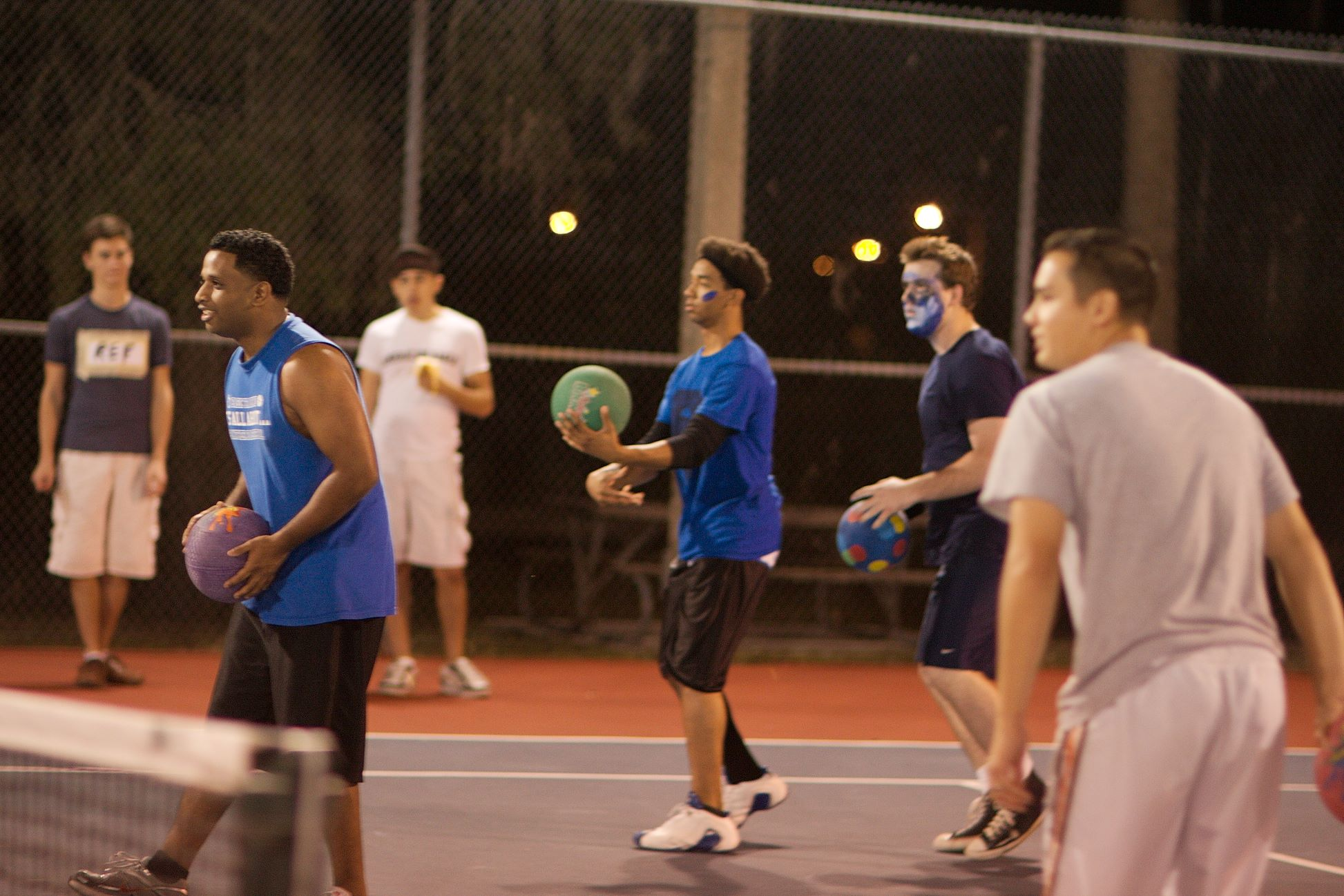
- Country: India
- Governing body: Indian Dodgeball Federation (IDBF) and Dodgeball Federation of India (DFI)
- National team: India

Dodgeball is a growing sport in India. The sport, which involves players on two teams trying to hit opponents with balls while avoiding being hit themselves, has seen a rise in popularity in schools, colleges and local communities. Dodgeball's fast-paced nature and emphasis on teamwork have made it a popular choice for physical education programs and physical education curricula.It is particularly popular in states like Maharashtra, Gujarat, Karnataka, Delhi, and Tamil Nadu. Bounce dodgeball is also played in India.

== Governing bodies ==
There are two organisations that oversee dodgeball in India, the India Dodgeball Federation (affiliated with the World Dodgeball Federation) and the Dodgeball Federation of India (affiliated with the World Dodgeball Association).

== History ==
Dodgeball is considered as a traditional game in India. The origins of dodgeball in India can be traced back to traditional games like Maram Pitti, also known as Picchi Banti in Telugu, which is similar to dodgeball and played with a rubber or tennis ball. A variation of the game is played called "Sekan-tadi" (सेकन-तड़ी). This is slang used for "slamming the hip." Another name is Gend Tadi (எறி பந்து). These traditional games laid the foundation for the modern sport of dodgeball in the country.

== Competitions ==
A Dodgeball Premier League tournament was held in Madhya Pradesh in June 2023. The Second Senior National Dodgeball Championship was held in Ellora, Maharashtra in October 2023.
