= Substitution (sport) =

Replacing one player with another during a match

In team sports, substitution (or interchange) is replacing one player with another during a match. Substitute players that are not in the starting lineup (also known as bench players, backups, interchange, or reserves) reside on the bench and are available to substitute for a starter. Later in the match, that substitute may be substituted for by another substitute or by a starter who is currently on the bench.

Free substitution or rolling substitution is a rule in some sports that allows players to enter and leave the game for other players many times during the course of a game, generally during a time-out or other break in live play; and for coaches to bring in and take out players an unlimited number of times. In other sports, limited substitution restricts the manner in which players can be replaced.

== Sports that allow free substitution ==
=== Sports that allow unlimited substitution during live play ===
- Beach soccer, futsal and indoor soccer: Unlike standard association football, these variants of the sport allow for an unlimited number of substitutions during a match. Players may be substituted at any time, except for the goalkeeper, who may only be substituted during a stoppage in play. In beach soccer, if a player is dismissed due to a red card, they may be replaced after at least two minutes has elapsed. In futsal and indoor soccer, if a player is dismissed due to a red card, they may not be replaced and their team will be short-handed for the rest of the match.
- Canoe polo: Per ICF rules, players may be substituted at any time, however players who have capsized may not be substituted until the next break in play, unless the capsized player is still able to make it back to the substitution area unaided. Players who receive a yellow card are excluded for two minutes and cannot be substituted, and players who receive a red card are ejected and cannot be replaced for the rest of the match.
- Handball: Any number of players may be substituted at any point in the game, except for players serving a suspension. If a player receives a red card and is disqualified from the match, they cannot be replaced until two minutes has elapsed. Junior handball competitions organized by some countries' governing bodies may only allow substitutions while in possession of the ball or during timeouts. In beach handball, when players are suspended or disqualified from the game, they may be replaced by their team immediately after the next change in possession.
- Hockey: In general, most forms of hockey allow for free substitution at any time except during specific situations. Practically every form of hockey uses a penalty box or equivalent (Note: In floorball, the area where players serve penalties is called the penalty bench. In indoor field hockey, it is called the suspension area. In outdoor field hockey, it has no official name, however it may colloquially be referred to as a sin bin in countries where rugby is also commonly played.) and in all forms, players who are serving a penalty or suspension may not be substituted until after their penalty or suspension is complete. Furthermore, all of the forms of hockey listed below permit teams to pull their goaltender and replace them with another player who is not a goaltender in order to gain an extra attacker. (Note: The rules of some leagues and organizations may only allow teams do this during the last few minutes of a period or of a game, however, this is mostly a formality, as in hockey, it is exceptionally rare for teams to pull their goalies outside of approximately the last five minutes or so of regulation time.)
  - Bandy: Players may be substituted at any time except during corner strokes. If a player is sent off due to a red card, they may not be replaced and their team will be short-handed for the rest of the match.
  - Broomball: Players may be substituted at any time.
  - Field hockey: Players may be substituted at any time except during a penalty corner; goalkeepers may only be substituted during a stoppage in play, except during a penalty corner. If a player is sent off due to a red card, they may not be replaced and their team will be short-handed for the rest of the match. These rules also apply to indoor field hockey.
  - Floor hockey and roller hockey: Most variants of floor hockey and roller hockey, including the official rules of ball hockey, floorball, inline hockey, and quad hockey, allow players to be substituted at any time.
  - Ice hockey: Players may be substituted at any time, with a few exceptions. If a player ices the puck, if their goaltender holds a puck that was shot from beyond the center red line for a stoppage or if they dislodge their own team's goalposts, then that player's team in each instance may not make any changes until after the ensuing face-off. In addition, if the goaltender leaves the ice in favor of a sixth skater at any time during overtime, the goal must remain empty until the next stoppage of play. The standard line-up for professional ice hockey teams includes four lines of forwards and three pairings of defensemen in rotation during any given game. However, line-ups with 13 forwards and five defensemen or 11 forwards and seven defensemen are sometimes employed either as a strategic decision by the head coach or out of necessity created by injuries.
  - Ringette: Players may be substituted at any time except during a goaltender ring (similar to a goal kick in association football).
  - Underwater hockey: Players may be substituted at any time and players who are dismissed from the game may not be replaced, leaving their team short-handed for the rest of the match. Underwater hockey is unique among hockey codes in that there is no goaltender position, so the above rules about pulling the goaltender are not applicable.
- Lacrosse: Both field and box lacrosse allow for players to be substituted at any time during the game and substitutions happen frequently in both codes. At collegiate and professional levels of field lacrosse, it is a common strategy for the team with possession of the ball to substitute defensive players with offensive players while they move the ball up the field from their defending zone into their attacking zone, and for the defending team to substitute their offensive players with defensive ones as they are pushed back into their defending zone. In box lacrosse, it is more common for teams to have lines similar to ice hockey, with professional box lacrosse teams typically having three lines of forwards and three pairings of defensemen. Like hockey and handball, lacrosse players who are serving a penalty may not be substituted.
- Quadball: Teams have unlimited substitutions, however substitutions may only be made during live play: substitution during stoppages is not allowed except to replace an injured or ejected player. Players in the penalty box may not be substituted, and players who receive a red card and are ejected from the game may be replaced after two minutes.
- Touch rugby: Called interchanges in touch, teams may freely interchange players at any time, with the one exception being that when there is a change in possession due to an intercept, neither team may interchange players until the next stoppage of play. Players in the sin bin may not be interchanged, and players who are dismissed from the game may not be replaced and their team must play short-handed.

=== Sports that allow unlimited substitutions during stoppages of play only ===
- Basketball: Basketball allows for unlimited substitution of players at most dead ball scenarios, with two main exceptions: First, players may not be substituted before a free throw. Second, substitutions are generally not permitted after a successful field goal, although some leagues and organizations may allow substitutions after field goals during the last few minutes of the game only. Players are allowed to go out and come in again any number of times, unless they are disqualified or ejected, and substitutions happen frequently. These rules also apply to 3x3 basketball.
- Dodgeball: Per World Dodgeball Federation rules, players may be freely substituted between each set. If a player is injured during a set, they may only be replaced if their team calls a timeout. Players who receive a red card and are ejected may not be replaced and their team will play short-handed for the rest of the match. Amateur and recreational rules may vary.
- Fistball: Players may be freely substituted between rallies, or mid-rally if a referee makes a stoppage of play. Players serving a suspension may not be substituted and players who are disqualified by a referee may not be replaced and their team will be short-handed for the rest of the match.
- Gridiron football: Players can be changed during any dead ball situation. Most college and pro football teams use 11 completely different players (Note: 12 players in Canadian football, 8 players in indoor football.) on offense and defense. Often, substitution is made depending on the play being run; for example, a team might bring in a fullback or tailback for a rushing play, or several wide receivers for a passing play. There are also major substitutions made for special teams plays such as punting or kicking a field goal. Players cannot be substituted during live ball play; if a player leaves the field during play without being forced, the player cannot return or be replaced until the next play. (Historically, gridiron-based codes had a one-platoon system in place that required all players to play all phases of the game. The one-platoon system was largely abolished in the 1940s but aspects of it remained in force in college football until the 1960s, at which time total free substitution was implemented.)
- Polo: Teams may freely substitute both players and ponies (horses) between each chukka, as long as no handicap rules are violated. Polo rosters contain between four and eight players, and teams are required to have at least two ponies per player, although at the higher levels of the sport, it is common for teams to have many more. Players who have been ejected from the game due to a red card may be replaced after two minutes.
- Roller derby: Teams may freely substitute players between jams, except for players serving a penalty in the penalty box. If a player is expelled from the game during a jam, they may not substituted with another player until after the end of the jam.
- Tchoukball: Teams may freely substitute players after every point. Players expelled from the game by a referee may be replaced.
- Ultimate: Per WFDF rules, teams are allowed unlimited substitutions after every goal. However, both the American Ultimate Disc League and Premier Ultimate League further allow teams to make unlimited substitutions during time-outs as well.
- Water polo: Water polo permits an unlimited number of substitutions, however, per FINA rules, rolling substitution during live play is only allowed in Olympic competitions. For all other matches, players may only be substituted during the interval between periods, after a goal, during a timeout, or to replace an injured player. Players serving an exclusion foul may not be substituted until the end of their foul and players who have been ejected from the game may not be replaced until at least four minutes have elapsed.

== Sports with limited substitution ==
=== Sports that allow a limited number of substitutions ===
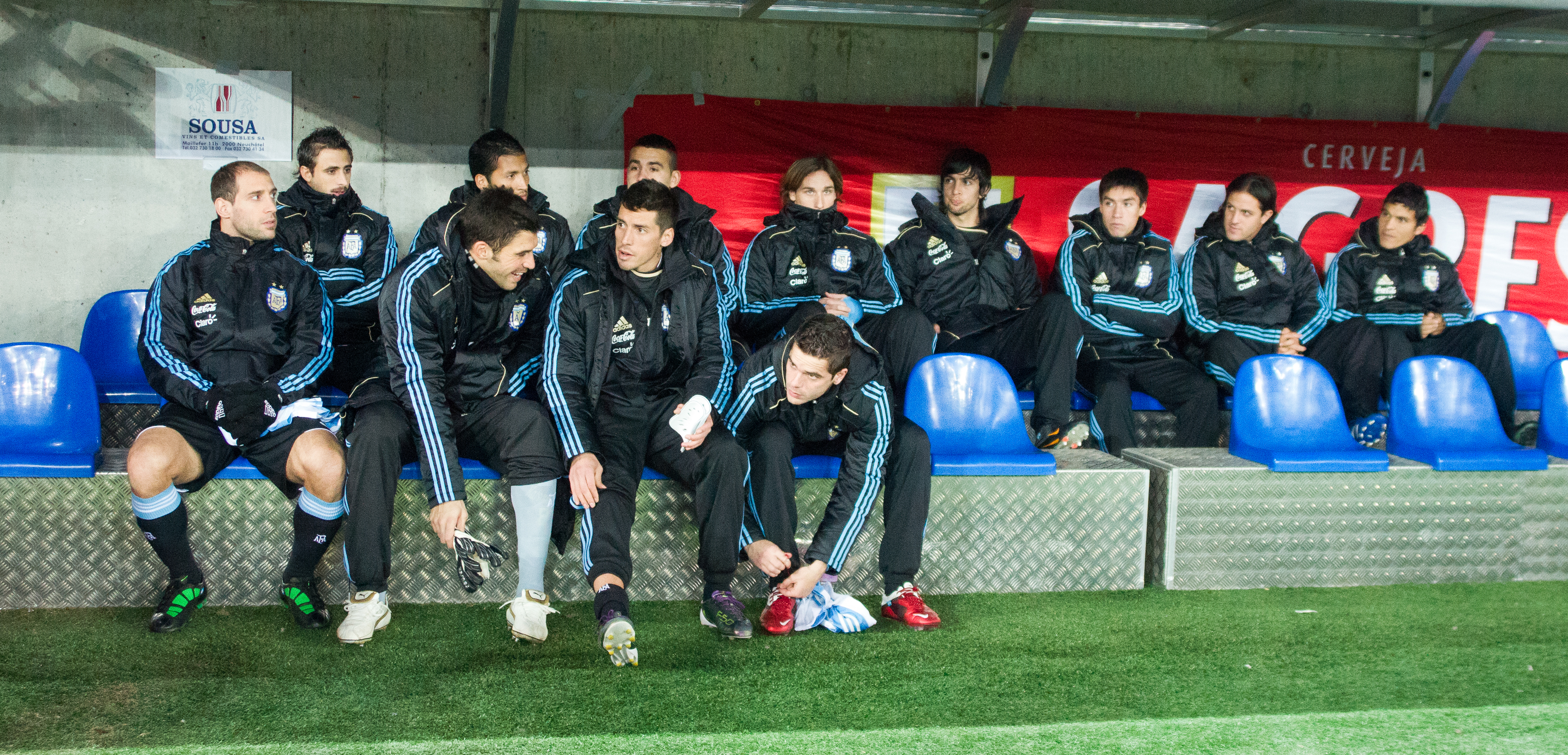
Argentina's association football team substitute bench in 2011

- Association football

Per IFAB rules, teams are allowed up to five substitutions per game, and players may only be substituted during a stoppage in play. Players who leave the game may not return, and if a team runs out of substitutions and loses a player due to injury or expulsion, they must play the rest of the game short handed. A fourth substitution during extra time was trialed by FIFA during the 2018 FIFA World Cup and 2019 FIFA Women's World Cup. At many amateur levels, unlimited substitution is allowed whenever the ball goes out of play..

- Bat-and-ball games: In general, in most bat-and-ball games, including those listed here, new player(s) inherit the place in the batting order of the player(s) that they are replacing.
  - Baseball: In most baseball leagues, substitutions may be made during any dead-ball, and a player who is replaced by a substitute may not return to the game. Baseball does not have an explicit cap on the number of substitutions that can be made in a game, although in practice teams must adhere to roster limits and may not make more substitutions than the number of players the team has in reserve (often referred to as the bench, or the bullpen regarding pitchers), which is usually the active roster limit minus the nine starters. (Note: The active roster limit in Major League Baseball (MLB) is generally 26 players, of which a maximum of 13 can be designated as pitchers, while the active roster limit for both Nippon Professional Baseball and Triple-A leagues is 28 players. On days an MLB team is scheduled to play a doubleheader before September 1, the roster limit is 27 players, all of which are available for both games. Between September 1 and the end of the regular season, the MLB roster limit is 28 players, reverting back to 26 players for the postseason.) Many youth baseball leagues, such as Little League and American high school baseball, have a modified version of this rule to reduce injury, in which a player may return to the game one time after being replaced, with the caveat that players who return to the game must return to the same place in the batting order as they were before, and some recreational leagues allow for unlimited substitution.
    - Baseball5: Baseball5 rosters contain five starting players and three substitutes. Players in the starting line-up may re-enter the game only once, where they must take their original place in the batting order, whereas players outside the starting line-up who enter the game as substitutes may not re-enter the game after leaving it. Unlike baseball and softball, but similar to pesäpallo, substitution in B5 may only be made between innings or when teams switch sides, except in cases of injury.
    - Softball: Per WBSC rules, players in the starting line-up are allowed to re-enter the game only once after being substituted out and must take their original place in the batting order upon re-entry. Players outside the starting line-up who entered the game as substitutes may not re-enter the game after leaving, except as a replacement for an injured player. Like baseball, the number of substitutions a team can make is limited by the team's roster size, (Note: The maximum roster size in softball varies by organization, but is typically in the range of 15-20.) and also like baseball, substitutions in softball can be made during any dead-ball. Recreational softball leagues commonly play with unlimited substitution.
  - Pesäpallo: Substitutions can only be made between each inning or half-inning, when teams switch sides, and may not be made during either the first inning or the super-inning (extra inning). Unlike in baseball and softball, a pesäpallo player may re-renter the game any number of times, but after leaving the game a player may only re-enter after at least two half-innings have passed, and players who have entered the game may only leave again after they have played at least two half-innings. Although there is no limit in the rules to the number of substitutions allowed, since pesäpallo rosters consist of nine players and three substitutes, and each player has to wait at-least two half-innings after leaving the game before they can be substituted back in, teams are functionally limited to a maximum of three substitutions per inning.
- Curling: Although some amateur tournaments may not allow any form of substitution, at the higher levels of the sport teams are usually allowed to designate a fifth member of the team as an alternate who may be substituted at any point during a game for any other team-member. Once a player has been substituted, they cannot return to the game, giving curling a limit of one substitution per game.
- Cycle Polo: According to IBPF Rules teams consists of four players and two substitutes. Players may be freely substituted during the intervals between chukkars. However, as matches normally consist of four chukkars, teams may only make a maximum of six replacements per game. If a player receives a red card, they are excluded from play and their team must play short-handed for the rest of the chukkar. At the discretion of the umpires, and depending on the severity of the infraction, the excluded player(s) may be allowed to return to play at the next interval, or may be excluded from the rest of the match, but allowed to be substituted by another player at the next interval.
- Gaelic sports: In all Gaelic sports, substitutions may only be made during a stoppage of play.
  - Gaelic football and hurling: Per Gaelic Athletic Association rules, which govern most matches, teams are allowed a maximum of five substitutions per game, with an additional three allowed during extra time. However, the National Football League and National Hurling League allow teams to make a total of seven substitutions per match, but still only five opportunities for substitutions, meaning the first and second double-substitutions that a team makes during a match will each only be counted as one substitution instead of two. In both sports, teams are only allowed to replace a maximum of three ejected players during a match, after which they must play short-handed. Like rugby union, gaelic football and hurling both allow an unlimited number of temporary "blood substitutions" (see the rugby union rules below), however, unlike rugby union, GAA rules do not specify a time limit for the temporary substitution. Players who have left the match may not re-enter the game, except to serve as a temporary substitution. These rules all also apply to camogie, except camogie allows for five substitutions during extra time instead of three.
  - Shinty: Teams are allowed a maximum a three substitutions each match, however players who have left the game may re-enter it. In a composite rules shinty–hurling match, teams are allowed a maximum of four substitutions per match.
- Gateball: Teams consist of five players and three substitutes. Players be substituted at any time, but once they have been substituted, they may not return to the game. Players who are ejected may not be replaced and their team must play short-handed for the rest of the match.
- Korfball: Teams are allowed a maximum of eight substitutions per game and substitutions can only happen during stoppages of play, however players that have left the game may be substituted back in any number of times. If teams have already used their maximum number of substitutions, they may gain permission from the referee for additional substitutions in the cases of injury and/or players being ejected from the game.
- Rugby football: Substitutions are more commonly referred to as replacements or interchanges in rugby. In all rugby codes, players serving a penalty in the sin bin may not be substituted, and players who have been permanently ejected from the game may not be replaced, leaving their team short-handed for the rest of the match.
  - Rugby league: In rugby league, interchanges may only be made during a stoppage of play, and not during play-the-ball, however players who have been substituted out may re-enter the game at a later time. Teams have a maximum of eight interchanges per match (10 in the NRL). Players who are replaced due to injury count towards the limit, however referees may award a team a free interchange if the injury is the result of a foul made by the other team.
  - Rugby union: Players may only be substituted during a stoppage in play and players who leave the game may not return, except to replace an injured player. Rugby union differentiates between tactical replacements, when a player is substituted by the coach for strategic reasons, and blood replacements, when a player is temporarily substituted while they leave the game to seek medical attention. If the injured player who left the game does not return after 15 minutes, the blood replacement is ruled to have become a tactical replacement. Professional and international rugby union allows for a maximum of eight tactical replacements per match, and an unlimited number of temporary blood replacements, although in practice it is rare to see more than one or two blood replacements per match. In amateur rugby, the number of allowed tactical replacements is usually lower due to smaller roster sizes.
    - Rugby sevens: The substitution rules for seven-a-side rugby are in general very similar to those of rugby union. Under the official World Rugby rules used at most international tournaments, teams are allowed up to three tactical replacements per match, however a variant rule allowing for up to five tactical replacements per match is commonly used at amateur tournaments and during some international friendlies.
- Sepak takraw: Teams, usually referred to as regus, are allowed up to two substitutions per set, and changes that are made between sets are counted towards the limit for the upcoming set. Substitutions may be made during any stoppage of time, and a player who has been substituted out may re-enter again. If a regu has already used all of their substitutions, and then lose a player to injury or from receiving a red card, then the regu must forfeit the set.
- Volleyball: Under FIVB rules, which are followed by almost all leagues worldwide, teams are limited to six substitutions per set, which can only take place in dead-ball situations and substituted players may return to the game. Substitutions involving the libero, a specialist player who can only play in the back row, are not counted against the limit under FIVB rules, but the libero can only be replaced by the player whom they replaced, with exceptions in case of injury. The NCAA follows these substitution rules in the men's National Collegiate division (Division I/II), but allows 12 substitutions per set in Division III men's play and 15 per set in women's play for all divisions. Furthermore, in NCAA women's play, the libero is allowed to serve the same spot in the rotation as the player she replaced, and is not limited to the back row, but may only enter the game in a back-row position. National Federation of State High School Associations rules allow 18 substitutions per set, with the libero able to replace any back row player without counting against the total. Like the NCAA, the libero is allowed to serve but must serve in the same spot in the rotation in each set and must remain on the back row.
  - In beach volleyball, similar to most doubles sports, substitutions are not allowed in any form and teams must forfeit if they lose a player.

=== Sports that only allow substitution to replace injured players ===
- Bowls: In doubles, triples, and fours formats, a player may be substituted with the permission of the opposing team's skip, or if the umpire judges the player is too ill or injured to continue playing. The substituted player may not play in the skip position.
- Cricket: Substitutions in cricket are only allowed when an umpire rules that a player is too ill or too injured to continue to play. As a result, substitutions are extremely rare in cricket and most tournaments do not require teams to dress a substitute player for a match, although teams may still choose to do so. In 2019, the ICC amended the laws of the sport to allow for substitutions in cases of concussion or suspected concussion in a player. Since the rule change, substitutions have become more common but still remain a relatively rare occurrence. These rules also apply to indoor cricket.
- Polocrosse: The substitution of either players or horses is only permitted in cases of injury.

== Sports with mixed or hybrid systems ==
- Australian rules football: In the top-level Australian Football League, each team has a playing squad of 23, of whom 18 are on the field and four are so-called "interchanges". The 23rd player is a designated medical substitute who can only enter the game if a teammate is ruled unable to continue play by on-field medical officers. At all levels of the game, players may be interchanged at any time, including during gameplay, but must enter and exit the field through the interchange area, a 15-metre stretch of the boundary line between the teams' benches (with exceptions in case of injury). In the AFL, each team is limited to 75 substitutions per match. Other leagues have different limits on the number of interchanges and the number of substitutions allowed. For example, in AFL Women's, each team has a 21-player squad, with 16 on the field and five interchanges. Unlike the men's league, AFL Women's has no limit on the number of player rotations during a match, making that league an example of free substitution.
  - International rules football: Under International rules, 15 players are on the field at any time and a further eight players are designated as interchange players. Teams are allowed unlimited interchanges between quarters, and a maximum of 15 interchanges during each quarter, which they may do at any time during play. Teams may also only interchange one player at a time, double-substitutions are not allowed. Players who are ejected from the game from receiving a yellow card may be replaced by other players, however players who have been ejected due to a red card may not be replaced and their team will play short-handed the rest of the match.
- Kabaddi: Teams play with seven players on the court and five substitution players on the bench. Teams may only substitute players during half-time or when they call a time-out, however during those times teams may substitute any number of players they choose, meaning they may substitute anywhere between zero and five players during each time-out and during half-time. As teams are allowed to call two time-outs each half, this allows teams up to five opportunities for substitutions each match and a theoretical maximum of 25 total substitutions each match. (Note: Starting the 2022 season, the Pro Kabaddi League allows teams to call three time-outs each half, giving PKL teams up to seven opportunities each match to make substitutions, or a maximum of 35 substitutions per match.) Players who receive a red card and are ejected from the game cannot be replaced and their team must play short-handed for the rest of the match.
  - Circle-style kabaddi: Circle-style kabaddi plays with the same system as standard kabaddi rules: teams may only make substitutions at half-time and during the two time-outs permitted each half. However, in this variant, rosters consist of eight active players and six substitutes instead of seven and five, respectively.
- Kho kho: Per International Kho Kho Federation rules, which are used in most organized competitions, the attacking team may freely substitute players at any time while attacking. The defending team may only make changes to their line-up before the start of their turn to defend, and are only permitted substitutions in the middle of a turn in order to replace an injured or ejected player. However, India's professional league, Ultimate Kho Kho, uses a modified version of these rules where, except in cases of injury, the attacking team may only make substitutions at the start of the turn or during the 30-second break after all defenders have been tagged out and the next batch of defenders prepares to play.
- Netball: Similar to kabaddi, netball teams, per World Netball rules, consist of seven players on the court and five substitute players on the bench. Teams are allowed to substitute any number of players (between zero and five) but only during the intervals between each quarter and the interval before extra-time. In a normal game, this gives teams a maximum of 15 substitutions per game, or 20 if the game goes to extra-time. If a player is injured and must leave the game, the umpire may stop the game to allow one or both teams to make further substitutions.

However, Australia's Super Netball uses a notably different system: squads only contain three substitute players instead of five and, starting the 2020 season, Super Netball allows unlimited substitutions throughout the game, as long as players joining the game assume the same position of the player that they are replacing. An analysis done by ABC News found that across the league, Super Netball teams averaged around 10 to 11 substitutions per game in the first season after rolling substitution was introduced, compared to an average of only three or four substitutions per game the previous season.

- Rounders: Rounders has notably more flexibility when it comes to substitution compared to other bat-and-ball games.
  - Ireland and Northern Ireland: Under the rules used by the Gaelic Athletic Association, teams are allowed a maximum of five substitutions per game, which can be made at any time, and players in any position, including those currently on base, may be substituted. Teams are also allowed an unlimited number of "blood substitutions" in case of injury, however if the injured player does not return to play within 15 minutes, the blood substitution is ruled to have become a regular substitution.
  - England: Under the rules used by Rounders England, there is no limit to the number of substitutions per match, however they may only be made during a "dead ball" (when the bowler has possession of the ball inside the bowling square), and players who are on base, or currently at bat, may not be substituted. Furthermore, under the English rules, if a previously substituted player returns to play, they must take their original place in the batting order, and batters who have already been put out that inning may not return to bat for the rest of inning, except to replace an injured player.
- Underwater rugby: Teams consist of six active players in the area of play, six exchange players on the sidelines (usually the edge of the pool), and three reserve players on the team's bench. Teams may freely substitute between the active and exchange players at any time during play and any number of times, however teams may only interchange active or exchange players with a reserve player a maximum of three times per match. This can be done during any stoppage of play, for any reason, including replacing expelled players, and players who have been interchanged off may re-enter the game, although this still counts towards a team's maximum number of interchanges. Players serving a penalty in the penalty box may not be exchanged or interchanged.

== See also ==
- Interchange (Australian rules football)
- Substitute (association football)
- Basketball#Playing regulations
- Baseball rules#Substitutions
- Interchange (rugby league)
- Substitute (cricket)
