= List of dodgeball variations =

The following is a list of rules and variations from around the world, for the collection of games known as dodgeball.

== Bombardment ==
Bombardment (also known as Pin Guard, Battle Ball, or Bombardo) is a game played with two teams in an inside gym (usually a basketball or netball court) divided into three roughly equal zones. Each team can roam freely in their own zone, or in the central no-man's land that divides their zones. If a player is hit with a ball, they are out. If a player catches a ball, the teammate who has been out for the longest time returns to the game (in some versions of bombardment, a player who catches the ball can bring back more players, or chose whom to return.), and the player who threw the ball is out. Deflecting a ball with a ball is allowed. Bombardment is played with two teams each with pins and dodgeballs. The objective is to knock over all the opposing team's pins or eliminate all the players on the other team. Players can get out by getting hit; however, it must be below the neck if playing with children.

=== Court variation ===
If a player hits a basketball hoop's backboard on the other team's side then that team frees all eliminated players.

=== Other variations ===
Another variation changes the purpose of the pins, in this variation, it restores all the members of the opposing team.

A variation shares the name "Bombardment" but the gym/field is divided into 4ths and a separate team occupies each quadrant. Teams attack all other teams until only one remains. A version of this can also be referred to as "German Bombardment" (See the German Dodgeball section for additional rules).

== Blob Ball ==
Blob Ball is a form of dodgeball similar to Blob Tag where when the person who is IT tags someone, they must grab on and follow them as if they were a blob. Once the blob reaches 6 people, they can split into two groups of 3 and so on. With Blob Ball, it's the same thing as blob tag except there's one person who is 'it' and when they hit someone, they must join hands and join the "Blob". The people in the blob who aren't the leader must follow the leader but can still pick up dodge balls and throw them, and if they hit someone the person who was hit must join the blob too. When the blob splits, a new leader is randomly chosen by the members of the blob.

In a variation, there is a defensive tactic. In these, if a player who is not in the blob hits with a ball, a player in the blob, that player is separated from the blob. The separated person will then join the person who hit them as their own 'good' blob, but the players in that blob may not tag people to get them to join unless they tag another player from the 'it' blob. The only way to separate people from the good blobs is to have someone from the 'it' blob hit them and then they rejoin the 'it' blob.

== Courts & Revival ==
Courts & Revival are both Objectives. List of courts: Mixed, a mixed court is a court that is split into three. The bottom part only team 1 can be on, the top part only team 2 can be on, the middle part both teams can be on, but neither team can throw. They can catch and dodge, but not throw. Sniper: A mixed court is a court that is split into six. The bottom part only team 1 can be on, the top part only team 2 can be on, the middle 4 parts both teams can be on, but neither team can throw. they can catch and dodge, but not throw.

List of Revive: Backboard, if a player hits the backboard that is not on their side of the court, the player on their team that was out the longest amount of time comes back in. If that player gets it through the ring, then their whole team gets back in. Team Fireball/Revenge: If you get out a player then a player gets you out then all the players that you got out get back in and you're out. The Shield Player is invincible, however, if the whole team is out except him/her then the opposing team wins.

== Dandy shandy ==
It is played with a minimum of three players. Two players stand about fifty feet apart facing each other and are considered the throwers. They are partners working together against the third player who is the dodger. The third player (dodger), runs back and forth in between the two throwers, whose job is to try to hit the dodger with a ball. The goal of the dodger is to dodge as many throws while running back and forth between the two throwers. The strategy is to stay as far as possible from the thrower that has the ball. For every attempt that the dodger dodges successfully they receive a point. A Thrower may strategically throw the ball to the opposite thrower in a manner where the ball is easy to catch and is of no threat to the dodger in an attempt to set up a play for the opposite thrower to get a good chance of hitting the dodger.

== Dibeke ==
Dibeke is a traditional South African game in which the attacking team attempts to kick a ball down the length of the field to score points, while the opponents can eliminate attackers by picking the ball up and throwing it at the attackers.

== Doctor dodgeball ==
Doctor dodgeball (also known as dr. dodgeball, doctor dodge, doctor-doctor, hospital, or medic) involves a leader in each team, usually kept secret from each other, who tries to avoid getting hit. When players are hit, they fall to the ground and wait for their team's doctor to come and save them, which is usually done by the doctor touching the downed person. When the doctor saves the fallen player(s), they can get up and play again. The game ends when one team is entirely eliminated, which is very likely if a team loses their doctor. Another variation of the game ends as soon as the doctor is hit. Therefore, it is key for a team to pay attention in order to figure out who the enemy doctor is, and to protect their own. Some teams employ a "fake doctor" strategy to throw the opposing team off-guard as to who the doctor actually is, but in some games the doctor is known to both teams beforehand.

One variant's rules are altered so that when the doctor is killed, a new player becomes the doctor. A similar variation is king's court, which also involves a leader. If the leader is hit, the game is over. Sometimes used in conjunction with pins. Another variant uses a "hospital" in which "injured" players who are on the ground are guided by players of either side back to the hospital which is at the rear of each team's playing area. A patient brought back to the hospital is "revived" and allowed to continue playing, though if they are brought to the opposing team's hospital, the player joins the opposing team.

== Fireball ==
Fireball (also known as Family Style) is a variation of Dodgeball in which there are no teams. If a player has a ball then they are not allowed to move their feet. If a player throws a ball at another player, then the player they hit is out and all players they got out are in. There are many other variants with other rules. Fireball is very similar to No friends.

=== Team Fireball ===
There are two teams and players can move while holding a ball. There may also be a line like in normal Dodgeball, or a limited amount of steps like in No friends.

== Gaga ==
Gaga (also known as ga-ga, gagaball or octoball) is a form of dodgeball which is played within an octagonal enclosure when available, or in any other space that is completely enclosed by walls. The objective of the game is to eliminate one's opponents by hitting the ball with either an open hand or closed fist into the region at or below his or her knees. That player is then out and must leave the playing area. A player can also be eliminated by having his or her ball caught in the air. Touching the ball twice consecutively without the ball touching another player or the wall is grounds for elimination unless that player is attempting to catch the ball. Carrying, throwing, or catching the ball after a bounce also results in elimination. Hitting the ball out of bounds is grounds for elimination unless it is as the result of a defensive deflection. Pushing a player into the ball and making any other physical contact is also a violation. This and other matters of dispute are settled by the game's judges. There is only one ball in play at a time in gaga. The game is started either by placing the ball in the center of the octagon with each of the players touching the wall, or by bouncing the ball and repeating the word "ga" each time the ball touches the floor. After three bounces the ball is in play and the players may leave the wall. Any player touching the ball or leaving the wall before the third bounce is considered out. This is also the procedure for resuming the game after a stoppage of play. Stoppages of play result from the ball being hit out of bounds or the ball being caught. A player being hit at or below his or her knees is not grounds for a stoppage of play. The winner is the last player left in the playing area. The game can be played with a large group of people playing for themselves, in teams, or one on one.

== Hunger Games ==
Hunger Games, also known as Survivalball, is a variant that attempts to mimic the eponymous series. Generally, it is played outside with minimal restrictions on playing areas, in an area with obstructions like trees or playgrounds to enhance the feel and nature of the game. Players start in a circle around the "cornucopia", where all the balls are piled in the center. After a countdown, players can rush for the balls or run away. If a player is hit, they are permanently out, and catching the ball is not permitted, the only options are dodging, blocking with your own ball, or running away. Players are allowed to form alliances, but can betray each other at any time. If a game goes on for too long, the playing area is gradually shrunken down until one player emerges as the winner.

== Killerball ==
Killerball (Swedish: Killerboll) is a non-team variant, played especially in Sweden among children, such as in physical education classes. In the game, one must throw a soft, rubber ball at other players to "kill" them with a legal hit, sending them out of the game (often only temporarily). The game is timed, the winner declared who finishes last.

All players are spread out in a gymnasium or other playing area. A ball is thrown into the air, and is taken up for throwing, after hitting the floor or a wall, by whoever gets to it first. It is then thrown at another player, and may be caught or picked up by any other player for successive throwing. A thrower must remain stationary after obtaining the ball, until the ball is thrown. A variation is to use more than one ball.

A player is "killed" by being struck by a ball, without catching it. Usually, a throw is "killing" only if a ball hits a player without hitting the floor or a wall first, but this rule is sometimes dropped. Headshots are discouraged for safety reasons, and thus a hit on the head is not considered "killing". One may also catch a thrown ball with one's hands, and then one "kills" the thrower. In some rule variants, the hands are also considered shields, such that a hit on one or both hands, without a catch, does not "kill" the player who was hit. A doubles variant using this rule, instead of catching, is to pair players up such that they must hold hands, each using their free hand to block throws, and to pick up and throw; the team of two is considered "killed" if either of them is "killed", or if they drop their mutual hand-hold.

"Killed" players are benched, waiting outside of the playing area (e.g., on an actual bench or a mat) until their "killer" has been "killed" in turn, at which point all players previously "killed" by that newly benched player may re-enter the game. There are several variations that require score-keeping of "kills": Each "killed" player is permitted back into the game after some amount of time has passed. Or all "killed" players can be periodically re-admitted at once, to keep the game going. Or positions on the bench may be limited, with the player benched the longest returning to the game when a newly "killed" player is benched; there might be four bench spots, or even just one. Yet another variation is that a "killed" player sits down in the game area exactly where they were hit, and remains seated, acting as an obstacle, until they can get hold of a ball passing nearby, which frees them to stand and resume play. In a variation, a player who is killed moves to the sideline of the other team. This player, or "Ghost" must remain in the area and is allowed to catch and throw the ball at the opposing team.

The game continues until only one player remains, having "killed" all others, and thus requiring no score-keeping. Or, for many of these variations, the game may be time-limited, and then the winner is the one who has "killed" the most players when the time is up; this requires score-keeping.

== Kill the Camper ==
In Kill the Camper, also known as Killers vs. Campers, players are divided into two teams: the Killers and the Campers. Similarly to Sharks and Minnows, the Campers must run from side to side of a marked area while avoiding getting tagged, after they are called to cross. However, rather than the tagging in Sharks and Minnows, the Killers instead have dodgeballs and "tag" the Campers by hitting them with a ball.

Typically, the game starts with three to five Killers, since eliminated players do not join the Killers' team. The Killers start in the center of the playing area with all of the dodgeballs and must stay there, if they exhaust their supply of dodgeballs they are only allowed to retrieve them after all Campers have crossed. If a Camper catches a ball, then they may cross safely without threat from the other Killers. However, if they are hit, the Camper must first stop using one arm after the first hit, the other arm after a second hit, and then one leg after a third hit. Upon being hit a fourth time, the Camper is eliminated from the game and must leave the play area.

== Maram pitti ==
Maram Pitti, also known as Picchi Banti (పిచ్చి బంతి) in Telugu, is an Indian version of dodgeball. It is played with a rubber ball or tennis ball and is often played by a small group, usually 5-6 players, in a small enclosed area or bylanes. The game can also be played solo, in pairs, or in teams of 3 or more players.

== One Step ==
One Step is a free-for-all dodgeball variant played in an enclosed four-walled space using soft foam balls. It is named after its movement rule, which limits players to a single step after picking up a ball. The game includes individual elimination and a revival mechanic.

In One Step, all players compete independently. A player is eliminated if hit by a ball that has not touched another surface. Catching a thrown ball results in the thrower being out. If a player is hit but another player catches the ball before it hits the ground, the thrower is out instead.

Eliminated players sit down where they were hit. A player returns to the game once the person who got them out is eliminated. This can lead to sudden shifts in active player count.

Players may only take one step after gaining possession of a ball but can bounce the ball off a wall and catch it to reposition. Players can carry multiple balls at once and are allowed to block incoming throws with a ball they’re holding, as long as the held ball is hit first.

The game is typically played in any enclosed room with four walls, such as a gym or practice space.

== Poison Ball ==
Same rules as normal Dodgeball, but there is one ball that is noticeably different (usually smaller and a different color) that cannot be caught or touched in any way. Players can hit (or pick up/juggle) the poison ball with other balls.

== President ==
In President, each team designates one player to be the 'president'. The president is generally kept secret from the other team. If either president gets out, that president's team loses and the other team wins. Hit players are permanently eliminated until the next round starts, making the game short.

== Protect the pin ==
Protect the pin (also known as P.T.P, dodgebowl, pin guard, poison pin, or pinball) is played like standard dodgeball, except that each team has plastic bowling pins, or similar objects such as tennis ball tins or cones at the rear of the court (usually evenly spaced on the last line before the wall). Once a pin is knocked over, it remains down for the duration of the game. A team loses either when all its members are eliminated or more commonly, when all its pins are knocked down. In protect the pin, the balls may be used to hit players, hit pins, or block other balls. If a player catches a ball, it eliminates the thrower and allows a teammate on the catcher's side to re-enter the game. This variation of dodgeball can be played in combination with other types of dodgeball, like doctor dodgeball.(Objective type is Win)

Some rule variations of "Protect the Pin" include rules where:

- Players are given multiple lives., with some versions allowing up to three.
- Knocking down a pin revives the entire team of the thrower.
- Teams each only have one pin.
- Players are only allowed to roll balls rather than throw them, and anyone hit by a rolling ball is out, although they can be blocked. Larger balls are generally used for this version.

== Prisonball ==
Prisonball (also known as doghouse dodgeball, prison dodgeball, prisoner dodgeball, battleball, graveyard dodgeball, Greek dodgeball, German dodgeball, teamball, crossfire, Swedish dodgeball, dungeon dodge, trench, jail dodgeball, jailball, jailbreak; king's court in Canada; queimada or queimado in Brazil; sniper in Japan; and Heaven in New Zealand) is played much like the original dodgeball game, except when a player is hit, he gets put in a defined area, the "prison", "jail", or "doghouse", behind the opposing team. To get out of prison, a trapped player must catch a ball thrown by a teammate. A player in prison may not eliminate anyone from the opposing team. "Prisoners" remain behind the opposing team until the game is over or they are released according to the current ruleset. In some versions of "prisonball" played on a basketball court, all players are released if a half-court shot is made into the opponent's basket.

In a variant called German prisonball (whether connected with Germany or not), the doghouse is extended to the sides of the opponent's court, as well as the back. No one may be released from the doghouse; however, anyone in the doghouse is allowed to collect balls and attack the opposing team, provided they do not enter their court. This makes for a hectic game since as players are eliminated, teams will eventually be attacked from all four sides. The last team with a member remaining not in the doghouse wins.

Another variant called German Dodgeball (not connected to Germany) is like Prisonball, but players only return once the opposing player that got them out is hit or removed from the game. In essence, the game will continue forever until one player/team eliminates all opposing players without losing any of their own team.

An actual German version of prisonball is Völkerball ('nationball'). It uses a single ball. Each team eventually has a player called their "king", who is the first on a team to go the jail zone, and returns to the main field when all teammates are in prison. The king has three lives, allowing for players to get back in. There are popular variations of Völkerball, including a recent Strand-Völkerball ('beach nationball') league. Völkerball is an official sport in the German gymnastics federation, played by women and girls.

Another version of prisonball is played by the YMCA in the United States.

== Seven stones ==
In seven stones (known by several other names in different regions of India), one team tries to throw a ball at a pile of seven stones to topple them, and then attempts to reconstruct the pile as fast as possible. The other team can throw the ball at the reconstructing team's players to eliminate them.

== Spider ==
Spider is a free-for-all variant of dodgeball with a wide-open playing area. The game begins with the balls arranged in a pyramid at the center of the playing area. A randomly selected player starts the game by kicking the pyramid, scattering the balls around the area. Each player attempts to pick up a free-roaming ball and hit someone else. Once a player is hit, they sit down where they were hit. If a ball rolls towards them (or is given to them) they can stand up again and reenter the game. The only way to win is for a single player to remain and keep away the balls from any players sitting down.

=== Spiderball ===
A version of Spider with slightly different rules is Spiderball, where the main differences are:

1. Temporary alliances are permitted. However, these alliances are informal, and participants may betray one another at any time without being bound by rules.

2. Players are required to sit down if they throw a ball that is caught by another player. Conversely, if a sitting player catches a ball, they can stand up and the player who threw the ball must then sit down, although this is rare.

3. When holding the ball, players are restricted to taking a maximum of three steps. After three steps, a player must get rid of the ball to move again, by either throwing it at an opponent or passing it to an ally.

4. Players may not circumvent the step restriction by tossing the ball nearby and retrieving it.

5. While not having a ball, players are not subject to any step limitations.

6. Sitting players, after getting a ball, cannot just stand up. They must first hit a standing player with the ball, which causes the hit player to sit down, allowing the thrower to rejoin the game.

Since players are not allowed to stand up as soon as they get a ball, winning Spiderball may be easier, and the endgame generally involves members of an alliance betraying each other.

=== Elimination ===
Elimination is largely similar to Spiderball, but with the major difference that players who are hit with the ball are eliminated from the game. They must wait on the side of the court until the player responsible for their elimination is also eliminated. Once this happens, all players eliminated by that specific player are allowed to return to the game. The same rules about having 3 steps with the ball and forming alliances from Spiderball apply. However, winning Elimination is extremely challenging, as winning requires one player to eliminate all other players. Because of this, the game typically does not reach the endgame, and "alliance wins" are sometimes allowed should an alliance eliminate all other players.

== Spud ==
Spud is a game similar to dodgeball where each player is assigned a secret number up to the number of players, and one person is chosen as 'It'. The 'It' person throws the ball in the air and calls a number. All players scatter except the one whose number is called, who must catch the ball and yell "Spud!" to freeze others, who must remain in sight without hiding. The player with the ball takes a set number of steps toward another and tries to hit them. If hit, the player gets a penalty letter (S, P, U, or D). If a player gets all four letters, they are eliminated. Catching the ball transfers the throw to the thrower. The game can end with the last two players as joint winners or continue with a final round thrown by an eliminated player.

== Trampoline dodgeball ==
This variant follows most normal dodgeball rules, but is played on a grid of trampolines and trampoline sidewalls. Players generally cannot be driven out of bounds, so gameplay options are reduced to hits and catches. The addition of trampolines makes the activity even more physically demanding than the regular game. It also allows for a wider range of jump plays as players bounce across several trampolines.

== See also ==
- Dodgeball
- Dodgeball ranking
- U.S. intercollegiate dodgeball champions
