= National Dodgeball League =

Professional dodgeball league in the United States

National Dodge ball League
- Sport: Dodgeball
- Founded: 2004
- No. of teams: 24 (at "peak")
- Country: United States
- Most recent champion: San Diego Crossfire
- Most titles: San Diego Crossfire (3 titles)
- Website: The NDL.com

The National Dodgeball League (NDL) is the only professional dodgeball league in the United States. The league was founded in 2004. At its "peak", the league was composed of 24 professional teams divided into the National and American Dodgeball Conferences. In addition to professional dodgeball, the NDL hosts the annual amateur Dodgeball World Championship (DWC) in Las Vegas, Nevada. The DWC draws dodgeball players from across the globe to compete in a tournament to determine the best amateur dodgeball team in the world. Prior DWC tournaments have included teams from Canada, Denmark, United Kingdom, Japan, New Zealand, and Australia.

== NDL Amateur Association ==
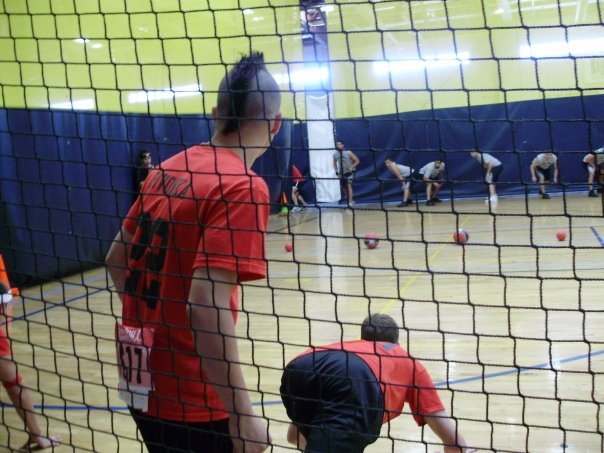
Before the opening rush of an amateur game during the 2008 World Championship

The NDL Amateur Association holds an amateur dodgeball season year round via the NDL Championship Tour. The amateur dodgeball season is composed of nationwide tournaments, and culminates with the Dodgeball World Championship (DWC). Once the DWC concludes, a new amateur season begins. Tournaments, also called tour stops, are held at various locations and times throughout the year. Each tour stop is formatted as a tournament between other amateur teams where winners gain points towards their national rank. Any amateur team may enter any and/or all of the Championship Tour tournaments, including the DWC. No prior qualification is necessary. Professional players in the NDL are required to attend any tour stops located nearby and manage the tournament.

=== Amateur dimensions ===
There are several divisions that players may participate in. Players are permitted to compete with multiple teams, but not within the same division. Players must be at least 16 years of age unless in the youth division.

==== Open Stinger ====
Played with four 8.5" rubber dodgeballs and two 5" rubber stingers. Teams may consist of any combination of men and women.

==== Open 8.5 ====
Played with six 8.5" rubber dodgeballs. Teams may consist of any combination of men and women.

==== Open 8.5 No Blocking ====
Played with six 8.5" rubber dodgeballs. Teams may consist of any combination of men and women. Blocking live dodgeballs with a dodgeball in your hand is not allowed and results in the blocking player being called out.

==== Co-ed 8.5 ====
Played with six 8.5" rubber dodgeballs. A team must have at least 2 women playing in each game or have 1 play but be limited to a total of 5 players in that game instead of the usual 6.

==== Women's 8.5 ====
Played with six 8.5" rubber dodgeballs. Teams must consist of women only.

==== Open No Sting ====
Played with six 8" no sting (typically foam) dodgeballs. Teams may consist of any combination of men and women.

==== Co-ed No Sting ====
Played with six 8" no sting (typically foam) dodgeballs. A team must have at least 2 women playing in each game or have 1 play but be limited to a total of 5 players in that game instead of the usual 6.

==== Co-ed No Sting No Blocking ====
Played with six 8" no sting (typically foam) dodgeballs. A team must have at least 2 women playing in each game or have 1 play but be limited to a total of 5 players in that game instead of the usual 6. Blocking live dodgeballs with a dodgeball in your hand is not allowed and results in the blocking player being called out.

==== Women's No Sting ====
Played with six 8" no sting (typically foam) dodgeballs. Teams must consist of women only.

==== Trampoline ====
Played on a trampoline dodgeball court with five 8.5" rubber dodgeballs. Teams may consist of any combination of men and women.

==== Recreational ====
A division where emphasis is taken away from winning the dodgeball game and placed on having fun. Teams earn points in categories such as Team Entrance, Team Uniform, Team Mascot, Celebrity Look-alike, Best Hair, Sportsmanship, and many more. The team accumulating the most points at the conclusion of dodgeball matches is declared the winner.

==== Youth Division ====
Not included as part of the Dodgeball World Championship, but available in other annual NDL tournaments. Players may range from 11 to 14 and 15 to 17 years of age in any gender combination.

== Rules ==
The NDL Amateur Association follows the same National Dodgeball League rules used in professional dodgeball. The rule is to eliminate the players on the other team. Headshots result in the thrower to be ejected from the game. The game is over when a whole team is eliminated from the game.

== Dodgeball World Championship and Convention ==
The NDL's annual Dodgeball World Championship & Convention (DWC) is held in Las Vegas and hosts the Amateur World Championships, the NDL Dodgeballer Awards & Banquet, and the professional teams' regular season over the course of several days in August. As of 2013, the first three days (Thursday - Saturday) are dedicated to the amateur teams and consist of round-robin play, a seeded single-elimination tournament for each division, and the Last Dodgeballer Standing competition. The evening events include the NDL Dodgeballer Awards & Banquet where the previous year's amateur and professional winners are honored. The final day (Sunday) is composed of professional team tryouts followed by the professional regular season and championship game.

=== Last Dodgeballer Standing ===
Last Dodgeballer Standing is a planned game involving all NDL participants and is essentially a large free-for-all version of dodgeball. All players are put in a sufficiently sized, self-contained playing area along with a pre-determined number of dodgeballs. To combat collusion among friends, the Last Dodgeballer Standing event format changes and evolves each year.

==== Last Dodgeballer Standing Rules ====
Play starts with all players standing along the walls of the play area followed by a scramble for the dodgeballs.

A player may only hold one dodgeball at a time.

If a player is holding a dodgeball, that player is restricted to a limited range of movement. The player may only take a certain number of steps, usually starting with 2 and, as other players are eliminated, lengthened to 3, 4, etc. and eventually free to run.

Each player is allowed to be "out" twice before eliminated from the game with each out generally marked upon the player's hand with a marker. An out counts as either being hit with a dodgeball or having your throw caught by another player.

The last player left is the winner and deemed the Last Dodgeballer Standing. The Last Dodgeballer Standing receives a championship belt and will have their silhouette placed in the next year's Last Dodgeballer Standing logo.

== NDL Professional League ==
=== Regular season ===
The NDL Professional league, first formed in 2004, is split into two conferences: the American Conference and the National Conference, with each conference consisting of four teams. Each team played the other teams in their respective conference three times.

Unlike most other sports leagues, the NDL holds its entire regular season in one day during its annual Dodgeball World Championship & Convention held in Las Vegas, Nevada. Each teams plays three regular season five-minute matches. Throughout the match, teams score points by winning games and eliminating opposing players. The top teams from each Conference are determined first by matches won, then by head-to-head points, and finally by total season points. The top four teams in each Conference advance to the playoffs.

=== Rules ===
The National Dodgeball League has created their own rules for professional dodgeball competition.

=== Teams ===
Team	City	Founded	Website
American Conference
Austin Matadors	Austin, TX	2011	
Boston Undertakers	Boston, MA	2010	The Official Website of the Undertakers
Chicago Vendetta	Chicago, IL	2004	The Official Website of the Vendetta
Georgia Scorchers	Atlanta, GA	2004	The Official Website of the Scorchers
Memphis Men In Black	Memphis, TN	2010	The Official Website of the Men In Black
Missouri Explosion	St. Louis, MO	2009	The Official Website of the Explosion
New York Epic	New York, NY	2004	The Official Website of the Epic
New York Guardians	New York, NY	2012	
Philadelphia Justice	Philadelphia, PA	2011	The Official Website of the Justice
Pittsburgh Punishers	Pittsburgh, PA	2010	The Official Website of the Punishers
Texas Shade	San Antonio, TX	2004	The Official Website of the Shade
Virginia Rampage	Richmond, VA	2010	The Official Website of the Rampage
National Conference
Arizona Resistance	Phoenix, AZ	2010	The Official Website of the Resistance
Dallas Doberman	Dallas, TX	2009	The Official Website of the Doberman
Houston Bounty Hunters	Houston, TX	2009	The Official Website of the Bounty Hunters
Las Vegas Vipers	Las Vegas, NV	2009	The Official Website of the Vipers
Los Angeles Chaos	Los Angeles, CA	2004	The Official Website of the Chaos
Minnesota Blur	Minneapolis, MN	2010	The Official Website of the Blur
Oregon Avalanche	Corvallis, OR	2004	The Official Website of the Avalanche
Portland Minotaurs	Portland, OR	2011	
San Diego Crossfire	San Diego, CA	2004	The Official Website of the Crossfire
Seattle Blue Dogs	Seattle, WA	2004	The Official Website of the Blue Dogs
Toronto Gryphons	Toronto, ON	2011	
Washington Buzzsaw	Olympia, WA	2011	

== Championships ==
=== By team ===
Team	Winner	Runner up
San Diego Crossfire	3	1
Los Angeles Chaos	2	0
Chicago Vendetta	2	0
