= DWC =

DWC may refer to:

- Al Maktoum International Airport, United Arab Emirates (IATA code)
- Daniel Webster College, a former college in Nashua, New Hampshire, US
- Darwin Core, biodiversity data standards
- Deep water culture, of hydroponics
- Diamond wire cutting
- Dodgeball World Championship
- Douglas World Cruiser, a 1923 aircraft
- Subarctic climate (Köppen classification)
