= Dodgeball ranking =

Official Dodgeball rankings

Dodgeball currently has two governing bodies, The World Dodgeball Federation (WDBF) with 87 member nations and World Dodgeball Association (WDA) with 62 national federations. The following information is for the WDA:

WDA World Ranking points are awarded to member nations who are part of the WDA based purely on their final position at recognized international tournaments. This does not include WDBF rankings. These events include, WDA World Cup qualifiers, the World Championship and World Invitational. Each category (men's, women's and mixed) will have their own rankings system.

Rank	Change	Men's Team	Points
1	Steady	Egypt	670
2	Steady	Malaysia	566
3	Steady	United States	256.65
4	Steady	Australia	240
5	Steady	Hong Kong	196
6	Steady	Singapore	173.75
7	▲10	Italy	117.73
8	Steady	South Africa	110
8	▼2	Canada	110
10	▼1	Japan	87.5
11	Steady	Philippines	76.25
11	Steady	Brunei	76.25
11	▼1	Iran	76.25
14	▼1	Pakistan	31.25
14	▼1	India	31.25
16	▲1	Switzerland	29

Rank	Change	Women's Team	Points
1	Steady	Australia	470
2	Steady	Italy	376.66
3	Steady	Malaysia	340
4	Steady	United States	289.99
5	Steady	Egypt	240
6	Steady	Hong Kong	167.14
7	Steady	Singapore	154.29
8	Steady	South Africa	110
8	Steady	Canada	110
10	Steady	Philippines	71.43
10	Steady	Pakistan	71.43
10	Steady	India	71.43
10	Steady	Iran	71.43
14	Steady	Switzerland	50
15	Steady	Brunei	20

== Approach ==
The WDA's World Ranking points are awarded to member nations based purely on their final position at recognised international tournaments. These events include, World Cup qualifiers, the World Cup and World Invitational. Each category (men’s, women’s and mixed) have their own rankings system.

== Calculations ==
National team rankings are built on an eight-year performance. Following the eight-year cycle, the new year of results will override the first year of the cycle, to be included in the rankings system. Meaning, only results within the four-year bracket will be included in the points system. WDA World Ranking Points Formula World Cup (Men, Women, Mixed): 1st – 240 points 2nd – 220 points Last Place – 120 points World Cup Qualifiers (Men, Women, Mixed): 1st – 120 points 2nd – 110 points Last Place – 20 points World Invitational (Men, Women, Mixed): 1st – 110 points 2nd – 100 points Last Place – 10 points The points awarded after 2nd place are spread evenly, in an attempt to ensure balance between international tournaments with different-sized fields. For instance, finishing 3rd out of 10 teams is considered to be a higher accomplishment than finishing 3rd out of 6 teams. Given that points are not fixed beyond 2nd place, a calculation is used to determine how many points are awarded for each position. The calculation gives the difference between any two consecutive positions from 2nd through to last.

== WDA Federations ==
=== Africa ===
- Angola
- Egypt
- Nigeria
- Sudan
- Zimbabwe
- Benin
- Ghana
- South Africa
- Tunisia
- Zambia
- Zimbabwe
- Burkina Faso
- Guinea
- Togo
- Ivory Coast
- Senegal
- Uganda

=== Americas ===
- Argentina
- Dominican Republic
- United States
- Chile
- Mexico
- Costa Rica
- Peru
- Colombia
- Puerto Rico

=== Asia Pacific ===
- Afghanistan
- Bangladesh
- Indonesia
- Malaysia
- Philippines
- Singapore
- Timor-Leste
- Australia
- Cambodia
- Iran
- Nepal
- Qatar
- Sri Lanka
- United Arab Emirates

- Bhutan
- Hong Kong
- Japan
- New Zealand
- (South Korea) Republic of Korea
- Chinese Taipei
- Vietnam
- Brunei
- India
- Kuwait
- Pakistan
- Saudi Arabia
- Thailand

=== Europe ===
- Belarus
- Malta
- Bulgaria
- Russia
- Greece
- Switzerland
- Italy
- Ukraine

==== Observer member ====
- Basque Country

== WDBF Federations ==
=== African ===
Country	Membership
Algeria	Provisional
Botswana	Full
Burundi	Provisional
Cameroon	Full
Central African Republic	Full
Chad	Full
Djibouti	Provisional
Gabon	Full
(Ivory Coast) Côte d'Ivoire	Full
Kenya	Full
Libya	Provisional
Morocco	Full
Nigeria	Full
Rwanda	Full
Senegal	Full
Sierra Leone	Full
Somalia	Provisional
Sudan	Provisional
Tanzania	Full
Togo	Full
Tunisia	Full
Uganda	Full
Zambia	Full

=== Asia Pacific ===
Country	Membership
American Samoa	Full
Australia	Full
Bangladesh	Full
Brunei	Full
China	Full
Chinese Taipei	Full
Hong Kong	Full
India	Full
Indonesia	Full
Iran	Full
Kyrgyzstan	Full
Malaysia	Full
Nepal	Full
New Zealand	Full
Pakistan	Full1
Singapore	Full
Sri Lanka	Provisional
Syria	Provisional
United Arab Emirates	Provisional

=== European ===
Country	Membership
Armenia	Provisional
Austria	Full
Belgium	Full
Croatia	Full
Czech Republic	Full
Denmark	Full
France	Full
(Georgia (country)) Georgia	Full
Germany	Provisional
Hungary	Full
(Republic of Ireland) Ireland	Full
Italy	Full
Malta	Full
Netherlands	Full
Norway	Full
Portugal	Provisional
Romania	Full
Russia	Provisional
Spain	Full
Sweden	Full
Switzerland	Full
Turkey	Provisional
United Kingdom	Full

=== Latin American ===
Country	Membership
Argentina	Full
Bolivia	Provisional
Brazil	Provisional
Chile	Full
Colombia	Full
Costa Rica	Full
Ecuador	Full
Guatemala	Full
Mexico	Full
Nicaragua	Full
Panama	Provisional
Peru	Provisional
Uruguay	Full

=== North America and Caribbean ===
Country	Membership
Aruba	Provisional
Barbados	Provisional
Canada	Full
Dominican Republic	Full
Guyana	Provisional
Haiti	Full
Trinidad and Tobago	Provisional
United States	Full
