= Murderball =

Murderball may refer to:

- Murderball (sport), the original name for wheelchair rugby (known in the U.S. as quad rugby)
- Murderball (film), a 2005 documentary about wheelchair rugby co-directed by Henry Rubin and Dana Adam Shapiro
- Murderball, a character in the film The Violent Kind

== See also ==
- Killerball (sport)
- Killerball (1989 videogame)
