= Utility ball =

Inflated ball used in several playground games and sports

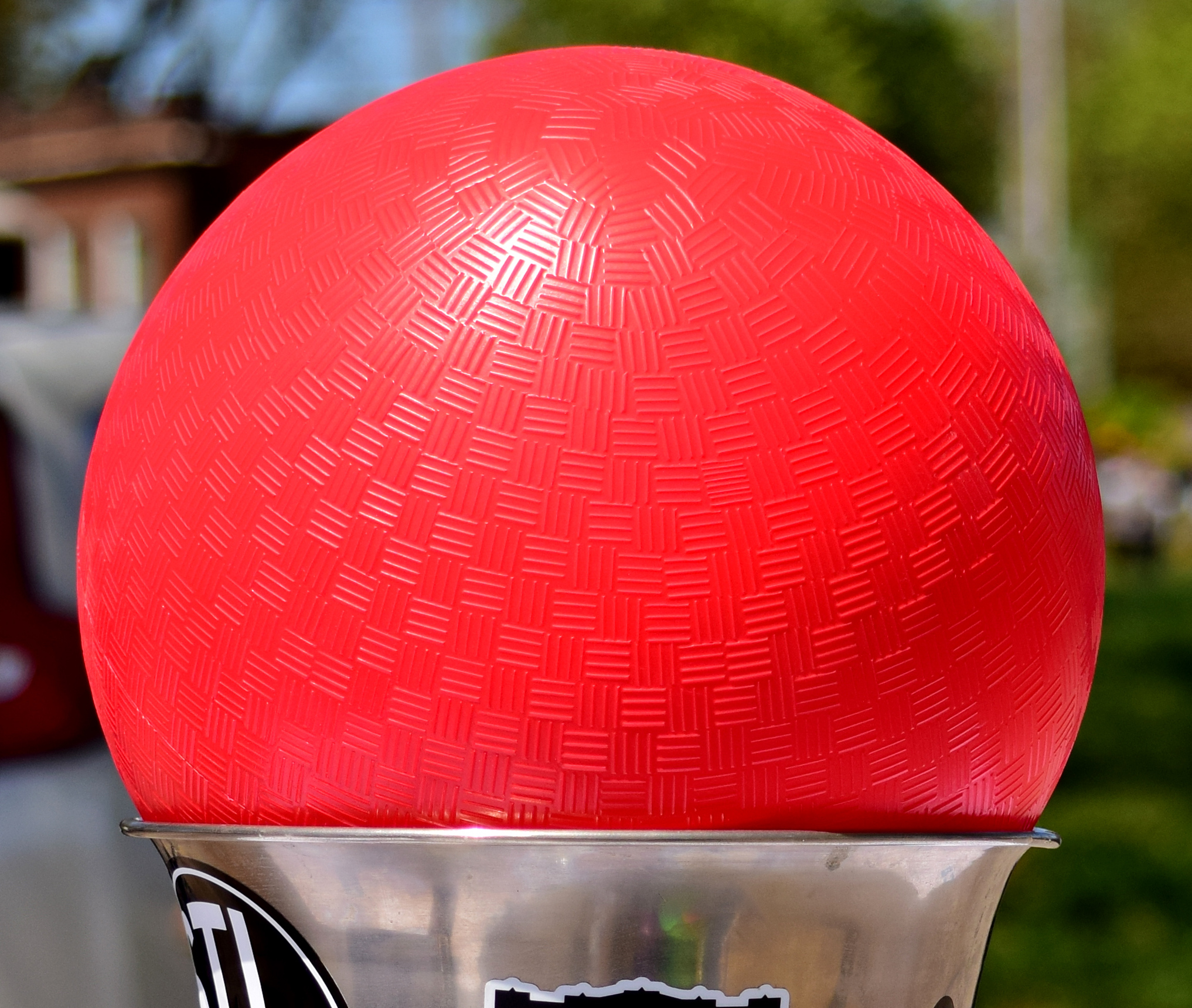
Red utility ball with grips visible

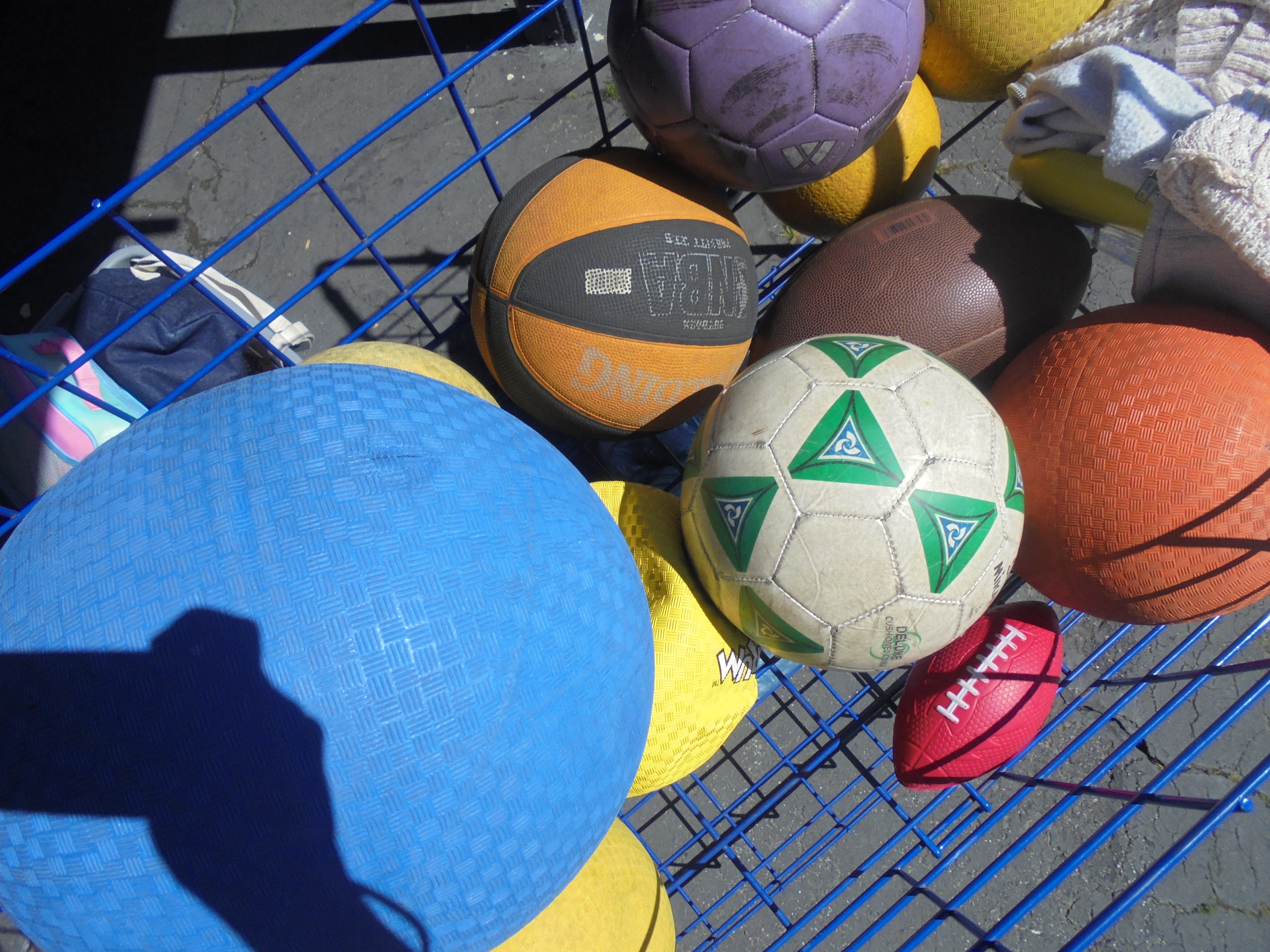
Blue, orange, and yellow utility balls among other sports balls

A utility ball is a spherical, inflated ball used in several kinds of playground games and sports. It is also known as a playground ball or named after the games in which it is used, such as dodgeball and kickball. Utility balls were introduced in the mid-20th century and have continued to be used in various games.

== History ==
The first dedicated utility balls were introduced by American manufacturer Voit shortly after World War II and became popular within a few years, being adapted to several games such as dodgeball and kickball that had previously been played with harder objects, like basketballs. The softer ball was safer and easier to adapt to other games, such as four square.

== Specifications ==
Utility balls are typically made of polyvinyl chloride or rubber and have a diameter of 8.5 inches (220 mm) and weigh between 11.6 to 13.3 ounces (330 to 380 g). The balls are often made with ribbing for grip and are inflated to 2 pounds per square inch (14 kPa).

== See also ==
- Spaldeen
- Funnel ball, a piece of playground equipment sometimes played with utility balls
- Bouncy ball
