= World Adult Kickball Association =

American kickball association

The World Adult Kickball Association (WAKA) is the largest sanctioning body for the recreational sport of adult kickball. WAKA was founded in Washington, D.C., in 1998 and now has leagues in over 35 states, as well as in countries such as India. The World Adult Kickball Association (WAKA) was named one of America's fastest growing private companies by Inc. Magazine in September 2010.

WAKA holds seasonal kickball divisions across the nation. Divisional winners are invited to the annual World Kickball Championship called the Founder's Cup in Las Vegas each October. The Charities are also a staple of the WAKA experience. Each division is encouraged to participate in at least one charitable event each season.

WAKA recently sanctioned a division in Iraq in support of U.S. troops.

WAKA has published official rules for its kickball league. In 2005, WAKA filed a lawsuit in the U.S. District Court for the Eastern District of Virginia against a rival, DCKickball. In the suit, WAKA claims intellectual property to the official rules of kickball, and seeks $356,000 in compensatory and punitive damages. The lawsuit was settled on April 15, 2008.

== Founder's Cup ==
Every year, the Founder's Cup tournament takes place in Las Vegas as part of Wakapalooza, the organization's biggest social co-ed League festival. Seventy-two teams take part in a three-day event through pool (round robin) and knockout competitions to determine the national champion of kickball.
