= Kickball =

Team sport

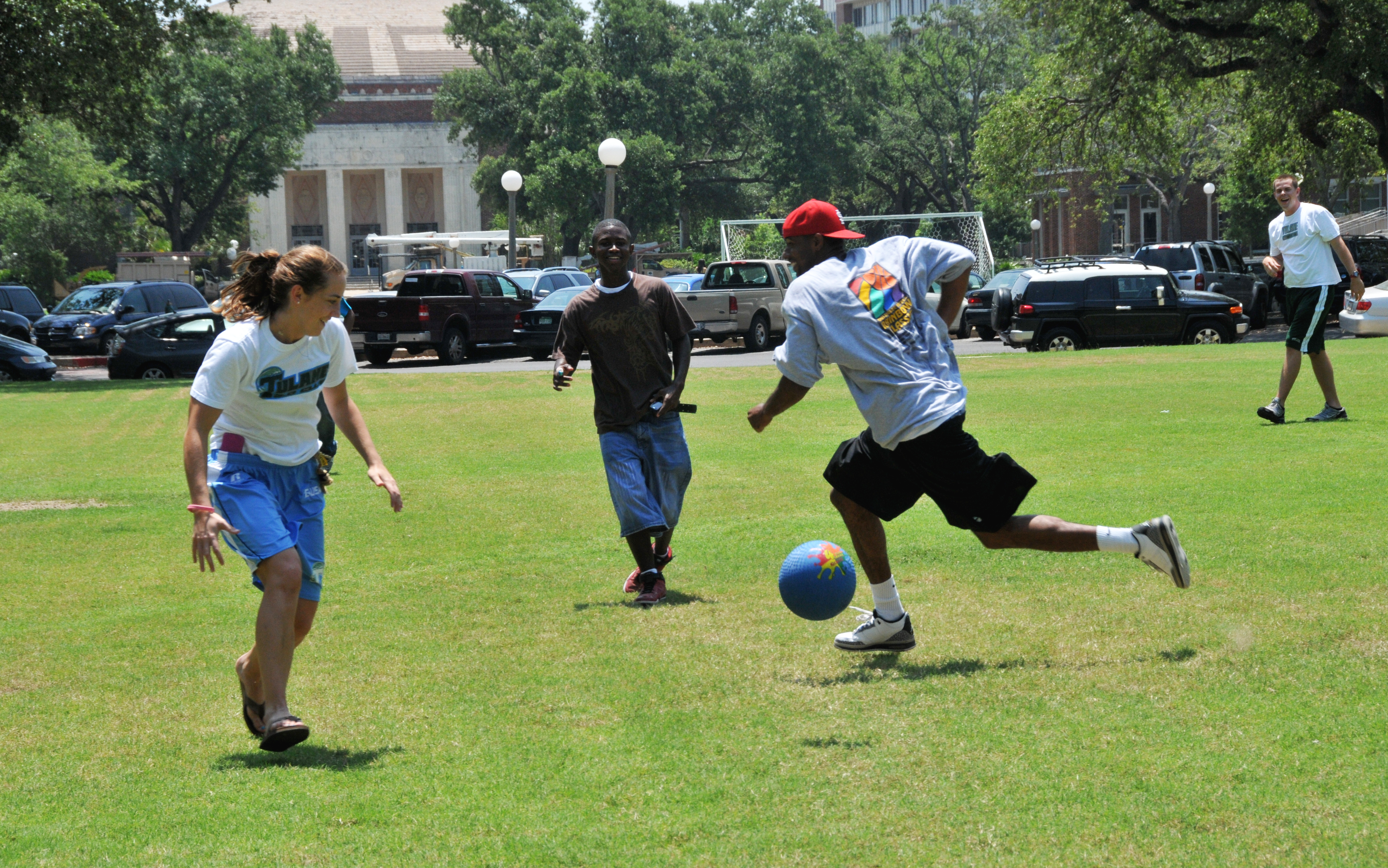
Adults playing kickball

Kickball (also known as soccer baseball in most of Canada and football rounders in the United Kingdom) is a team sport and league game, similar to baseball. Like baseball, it is a safe haven game in which one team tries to score by having its players return a ball from home base to the field and then circle the bases. Meanwhile, the other team tries to stop them by tagging them "out" with the ball before they can return to home base. However, instead of hitting a small, hard ball with a bat, players kick an inflated rubber ball; this makes it more accessible to young children. As in baseball, teams alternate half-innings. The team with the most runs after a predefined number of innings wins.

Kickball is typically played among young, school-age children, both as a playground game and as part of physical education (PE). The lack of both specialized equipment and highly skill-based positions (like the pitcher) makes the game an accessible introduction to related sports such as baseball and softball. In recent decades, it has gained popularity among adults, and today many cities are home to one or more organized kickball leagues for adults.

Kickball was likely invented around 1910 in the United States and began to spread from about the 1920s onward, mainly via PE classes in public schools. It became an especially popular recess sport on playgrounds across the country in the 1970s, and is now played in various forms in countries around the world, such as Canada, England, Japan, South Korea, and in South America.

== World Adult Kickball Association ==
The World Adult Kickball Association (WAKA) was found in 1998.

== History ==
There is debate on who invented kickball. More than likely, it evolved from baseball, or even softball, which was initially played inside gymnasiums when it was invented in Chicago in 1887. In the late 19th century, the YMCA was a hub for sports innovation, with basketball and volleyball being invented there. Around the same time, Charles Gregory Lang, a highly educated and respected physical director, is credited with inventing a lesser-known sport called Lang ball. The sport combined elements of baseball with a twist: players kicked a round, inflated ball (like a soccer ball) while hanging from a horizontal bar. The ball was served by a pitcher, and the rest of the game followed baseball rules with bases, runs, and scoring.

The earliest known set of rules resembling the game appeared in the book "Street Games of Brooklyn, NY" (1891) by Stewart Culin. The game was called "Kick the Ball," and a diagram in the book shows four corners of intersection used as bases. There were four innings of play, and outs are made on a fly out and when a ball is thrown towards the defender at home before the runner reaches any of the bases. A player is out when a kicker misses a kick. Interestingly, there was no pitcher to deliver the ball to a catcher at home plate.

In 1901, an organized game of "kickball" was played by youngsters in Chattanooga, Tennessee. "The game of kickball between the teams of the junior department of the YMCA and the First district school resulted in a victory for the First district with a score of 10 to 9," reported the Chattanooga Sunday Times on December 15, 1901. “This sport is creating much interest among the boys.” A few months later, a five-inning game was exhibited again by the junior members of the Chattanooga YMCA that featured “as much excitement as if it had been a professional game.” Nine players were listed on the rosters, but catchers were not; therefore, it is inconclusive whether the ball was delivered to the kicker as in the modern game.

The Cincinnati Post wrote an article on September 2, 1908, describing the popularity of the new game that was being implemented in Cincinnati-area public school programs. A regulation basketball was used, and games were held outside or inside school gymnasiums. “From the experimenting we have done, we are safe in saying it will prove even more popular than basket ball and can played indoors or out of doors,” declares Physical Director of Cincinnati Public Schools Dr. Carl Zeigler.

Kickball, originally called "Kicking Baseball", was claimed to have been invented as early as 1910 by Dr. Emmett Dunn Angell in his noted book Play: Comprising Games for the Kindergarten, Playground, Schoolroom and College: How to Coach and Play Girls' Basket-ball, Etc (1910). His description and field illustration in this book is both the closest and earliest known precursor to the modern game of kickball. He also notes that "The game seems to afford equal enjoyment to the children, and it gives a better understanding of the national game (Baseball), and at the same time affords them an exercise that is not too violent and is full of fun.".

A later documented inventor claim, as early as 1917, was by Nicholas C Seuss, Supervisor of Cincinnati Park Playgrounds in Cincinnati, Ohio. Seuss submitted his first documented overview of the game in The Playground Book, published in 1917. This description includes 12 rules and a field diagram, and refers to kickball as "Kick Base Ball" and "Kick Baseball".

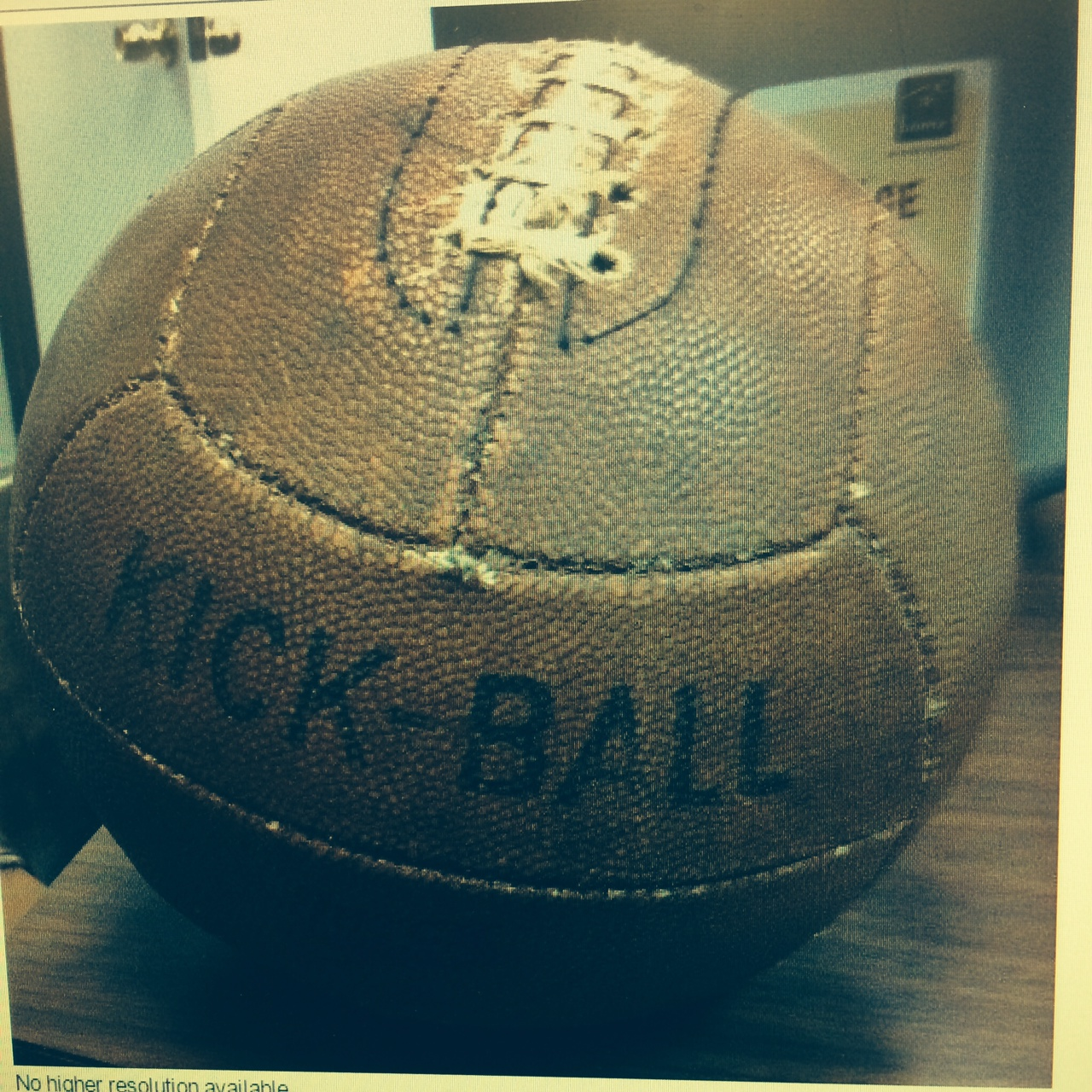
Example of a vintage kickball ball. This example was manufactured by Hutch Sporting Goods Inc., Cincinnati, Ohio, U.S.

In 1920–1921, "Kick Ball" was used by physical education teachers in US public schools to teach young boys and girls the basics of baseball. Around this time, the ball that was used was a soccer ball or volleyball. It was played by ten to 30 players and the field included a "Neutral Zone": an area not to be entered until the ball has actually been kicked. There was no pitcher, because the ball would be kicked from the home area, which was a 3-foot circle. The ball had to pass beyond the 5-foot line, and base-runners could only advance one base on infield balls. Teams would switch sides only after all team members had kicked.

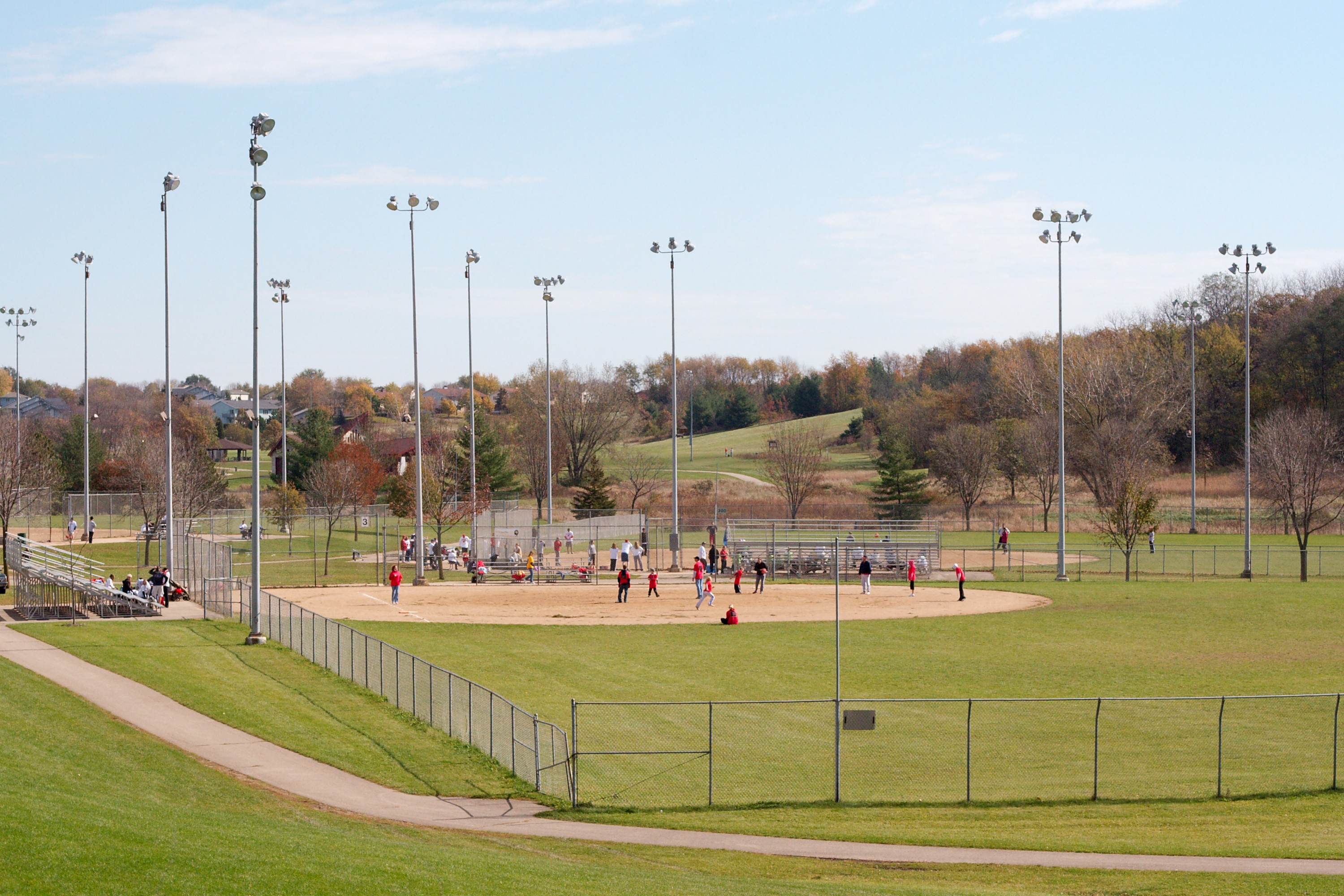
A game in Madison, Wisconsin, 2006

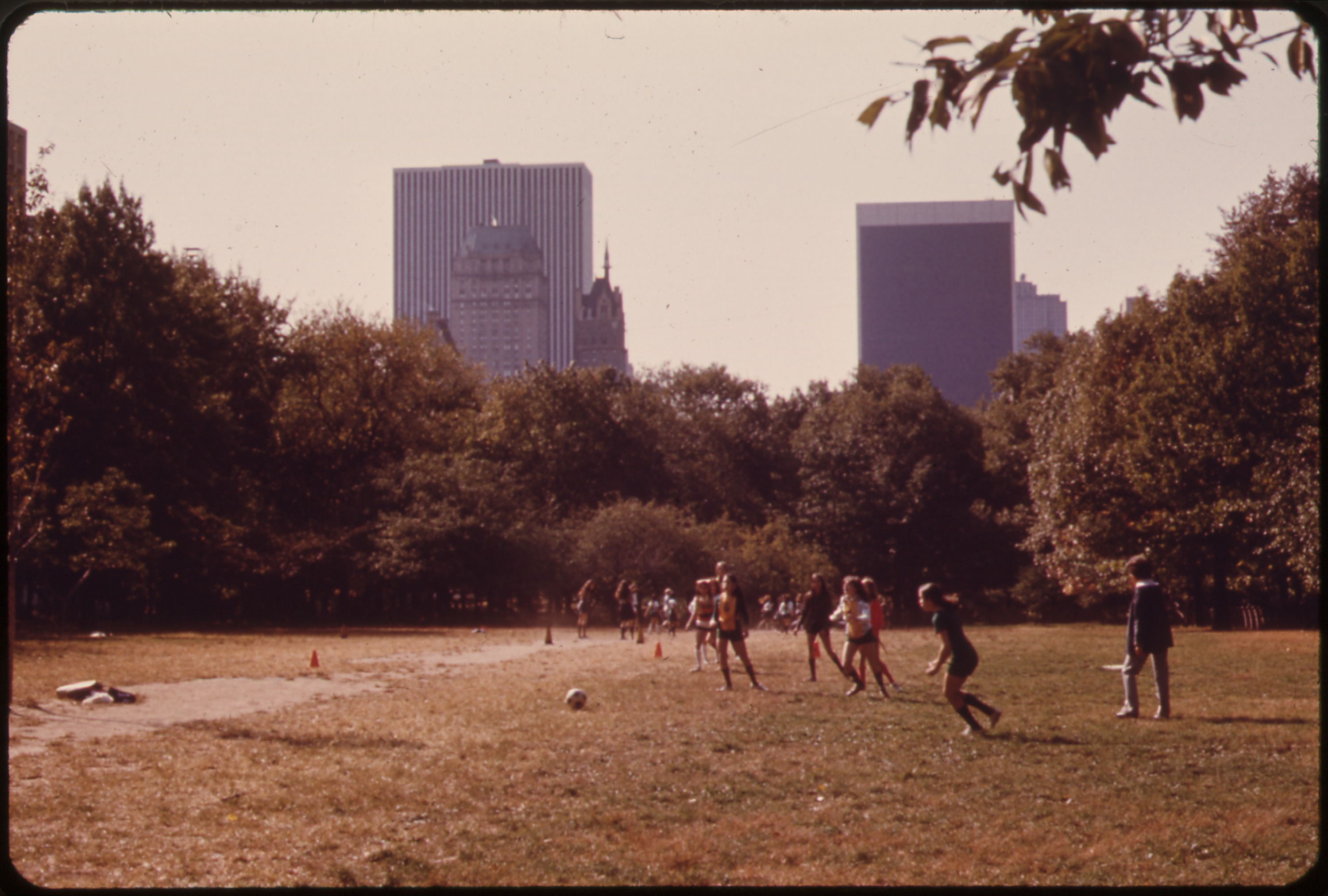
Girls playing kickball in Central Park, New York City, 1973

During this time, kickball was played on the same field as baseball except that there was only one base corresponding to a baseball diamond's 2nd base. Multiple players could be on base at a time, but all needed to get home before the last kicker kicked and the kicking order had retired.

There were also two shortstop player positions: one between 1st and 2nd base and the other between 2nd and 3rd. Home plate was marked by a 3 foot by 4 foot rectangle on the ground.

The first known adult kickball leagues were formed in Great Falls, Montana, in October 1921. A total of six teams were organized and games were played in the gymnasium of the YMCA. Ten teams participated the following session in 1922 and the local Great Falls Tribune reported on results, box scores, player lineups, and other incidents that took place during the game.There are no known rules, but teams consisted of six to nine players at times and hitting the runner with the ball was allowed for an out. Games would be called after one hour of play and the score at the last full inning would be the score of the game.

The YMCA scheduled games from November 22-December 27, 1922. Games were held at 5:15 pm on Monday, Wednesday, Thursday, and Saturday evenings. Teams were composed of local businesses that included departments from the Anaconda Copper Mining Company, along with local businesses that included the Great Falls National Bank and the Royal Milling flour company. Kickball was popular along with basketball, softball, and volleyball leagues at the Great Falls Y. Several other sessions were held throughout 1922 and 1923, but by 1924 it is unknown if the Great Falls YMCA continued housing games in the gym.

In April 1922, Daniel Chase, Supervisor of Physical Education for the New York State Department of Education, describes the earliest known account of adults playing kickball. This match took place at a conference of rural teachers in Mooers Forks, NY, where Chase was teaching games that the teachers could in turn teach to their pupils. They did not have a ball, so they made one out of an old stocking and some rags; it was about 7 to 8 inches long and tied off with an old shoelace. The construction of this makeshift ball was demonstrated to the rural teachers by Mr. Braddock Wells.

The teachers were assigned numbers to create teams; odd numbers on one team and even numbers on the other. The team captains chose college names to represent each team name: the odds chose Yale and the evens chose Princeton. The game of "Kick Baseball" was the last game they played at the conference to decide the championship for the day. Ten players were chosen for each team and the remaining were organized into a cheering section. Yale kicked first. On the field there was no pitcher, but an extra shortstop between 1st and 2nd base. Chase recounts that only three innings were completed in the heat that day, with Yale ending up as the victor winning 3 to 2. Furthermore, the cheering sections showed great sportsmanship, applauding all good plays impartially.

In the 1940s, American World War II correspondent Ernie Pyle reported kickball being played by U.S. soldiers during the Tunisia Campaign of 1942–1943. In addition, "Kick Ball" was promoted as an informal game for soldiers by the United States Department of the Army from as early as 1943. In this more difficult variant of the game, all kicks had to be home runs, by beating the kicked ball back to home after consecutive passes to all basemen before throwing them out at home.

Kickball gained prominence as a very popular recess sport and after-school game on playgrounds across the US in the 1970s.

== Field ==
Kickball is typically played on a softball diamond with an 8.5 inch to 16 inch diameter inflated rubber ball, such as a utility ball. As in baseball/softball, the game uses three bases, a pitcher's mound, and a home plate. Sometimes in less formal games, the field is not bounded by a fence (which traditionally surrounds a softball or baseball diamond), but is instead open. This may result in informal rule changes to accommodate the field, such as home runs being counted by number of bounces instead of by distance.

Kickball can also be played on a rectangular blacktop area with chalk or paint outlines, such as an open outdoor basketball court.

== Gameplay ==
Two teams alternate between kicking and fielding each inning. The fielding team's pitcher rolls the ball along the ground toward home plate, where the kicker attempts to kick it into fair territory. After kicking, the kicker runs the bases in order, attempting to reach home plate to score a run. The fielding team records outs by catching a kicked ball before it touches the ground, tagging a base runner with the ball, or touching a base while holding the ball before a forced runner arrives. Three outs end the kicking team's half of the inning, and the teams switch roles. The team with the most runs after a set number of innings wins.

== Popularity among adults ==
While kickball was long mostly considered a child's game in the United States and Canada, over time it has gained popularity among adults as a recreational sport. In 1998, the World Adult Kickball Association was founded, and since the late 1990s and early 2000s, many US and Canadian cities have created kickball leagues for adults, while additional governing bodies have also been formed. Some US cities even have multiple such organized adult leagues. Kickball is also offered as an intramural sport on many college campuses.

== Popularity outside the United States ==
Kickball is popular among youth in South Korea. Known as balyagu [발야구 (foot-baseball)], it is a staple in physical education (PE) classes within elementary schools.

In Japan, kickball is played by elementary-school students and is known as キックベース(Kickbase).

Kickball is a popular game played by elementary-school children in Canada, where it is usually referred to as either "soccer baseball" or "kickball." In some areas it may also be referred to as "Chinese baseball" or "California kickball."

In England, the variation often played in PE lessons in schools is referred to as "Football-Rounders," a mix of association football and rounders.

A related sport, "kickingball," is popular among Venezuelan refugees in Argentina.

== See also ==
- Baseball
- Softball – including slowpitch and fastpitch
- Matball
- Leg cricket
- Baseball5 – baseball with only a ball, batters hit the ball with a hand
- Tee-ball
- Little League Baseball
- Safe haven games, also known as "bat-and-ball games" (although bats are not always present)
- Wiffle ball
