= Emmett Dunn Angell =

American physician, author, and inventor

Dr. Emmett Dunn Angell
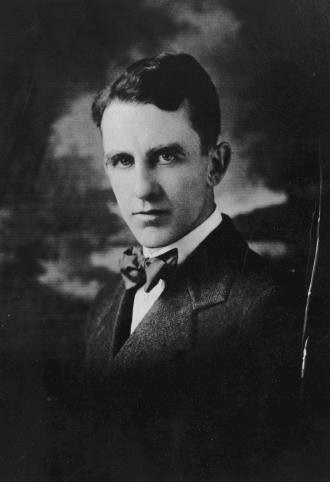
- Born: April 25, 1879; Mooers, New York
- Died: January 7, 1952 (aged 72)

Emmett Dunn Angell (April 25, 1879 - January 7, 1952) was an American physician, author, coach, professor, inventor, and naval officer. He was a member of the American Physical Education Association, American Medical Association, and the Alpha Kappa Kappa medical school fraternity. He was supervisor of the Worcester Playground Association, he was an instructor of physical education and men's basketball coach at the University of Wisconsin. Emmett was the instructor of games in the Harvard Summer School of physical training; with similar work being done at Yale. He was also the head of the department of physical education and men's basketball coach at Oregon State University.

== Early life ==
Emmett Dunn Angell was born in Mooers, New York in 1879. Emmett is the son of Nettie M. Dunn and Richard H. Angell. Notably, Emmett's maternal grandfather, Hiram Dunn, was an ordained minister of the Methodist Episcopal church before married. During the civil war, Hiram was appointed United States Marshall of the district of northern New York by President Lincoln, with whom he enjoyed a personal friendship.

== Career ==
Professor, Physician, Author, Coach, Naval Lieutenant, Inventor, Etc.

=== Military service ===
Lieutenant Medical Corps, United States Navy, April 9, 1917 – April 19, 1921. While serving as a medical officer in the United States Navy during the war, he was also the coach of the Great Lakes Football Team.

=== Coach ===
Head coach of the championship 1907-08 Wisconsin Badgers men's basketball team as well as the men's basketball coach at Oregon State. "Dr. Angell was the organizer of the Western and Northwest Intercollegiate Basket Ball Associations, and the game, at the schools at which he coached, reached a high plane of perfection. To him belongs credit for the introduction in the west of the short pass, the criss-cross, the back-pass and the shift plays, which he developed highly in the 1905 Wisconsin and subsequent teams. At Wisconsin University he handles the 1905 to 1908 teams inclusive, winning one championship, tying for first on two occasions and landing one second in the Western Conference. While at Oregon State University his teams landed the State Championship twice, captured the Pacific Coast Championship and led the Northwest Conference."

=== Author ===
He is the inventor of many games; authoring books up until 1920. His most notable book is Play: Comprising Games for the Kindergarten, Playground, Schoolroom and College; How to Coach and Play Girls' Basket-ball, Etc (1910). Thirty two games in this book are claimed to be original to the author. These games include various tag games, racing games, ball games, games in the water, and schoolroom games. His original game in this book named Kicking Baseball, complete with field layout and description, makes him the earliest known inventor of the modern day game of Kickball.

=== Inventor ===
He invented an "Exercising Device".

=== Play Authority ===
Emmett was hailed as a famous play authority and play inventor. In at least one newspaper he was labelled as "having invented more games than any other man". In May 1922, Emmett fetched an asking price of $700 from the Wichita Kiwanis Club for their Play Carnival Week, where he was scheduled for twenty lectures throughout the week. The presentation was a gift to the adults and children of Wichita to be happier and healthier through play. He's hailed as inventing over fifty games. A listing of programs slated for this event included the following

- Games for Men.
- Games for Women.
- Games for Boys and Girls.
- Games for Mixed Groups.
- Games That Develop Skill for Basket Ball, Football, etc..
- Social Games.
- Games for Boy Scouts, Camp Fire Girls and Girl Scouts.
- Schoolroom Games.
- Games That Mothers Should Know.
- Games That Teachers Should Know.
- Water Games.

Lectures:

- The Significance of Play.
- The Biology of Play.
- Making Americans.
