= Leg cricket =

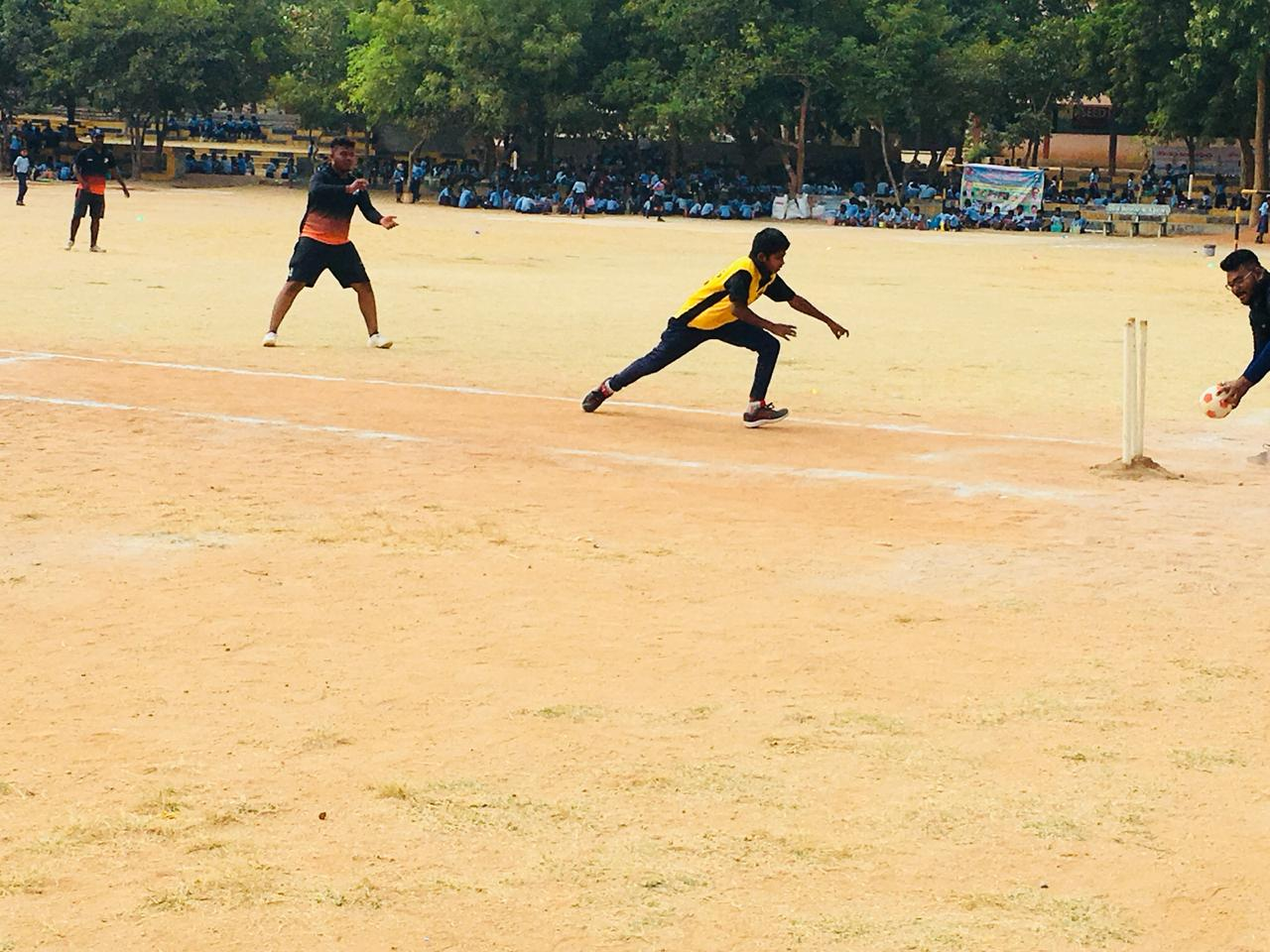
- Highest governing body: International Leg Cricket Council (ILCC)
- Nicknames: पाय चेंडू, लेग क्रिकेट, लात बॉल

Characteristics
- Contact: Permitted
- Mixed-sex: Yes, separate competitions
- Type: Team sport
- Equipment: Ball, Wicket (Stumps, Bails)
- Venue: Cricket field

Presence
- Country or region: India, Nepal, Sri Lanka, Bhutan, Indian subcontinent, Asia

Leg cricket is a form of cricket played between two teams of eleven players on a circular ground with a radius between 80 and 120 feet (24 and 37 m). The game is played in South Asian countries including India, Nepal, Pakistan, and Bhutan.

Leg cricket involves using legs rather than a bat to propel the ball. The bowler rolls the ball along the ground under arm. The legsman has to kick the ball to score runs. A legsman can score four or six runs by kicking the ball out of the boundary line.

== History ==
Leg cricket is a recreational game. It is mainly played in India with various rules. Leg Cricket was invented by S. Nagraj, a physical education teacher in Bangalore. He introduced this game to the school children of the town as a source of physical fitness. Jogender Prasad Verma, a physical education teacher in Delhi, introduced the official rule book of leg cricket in 2010. S. Nagraj is known as the father of leg cricket. Verma is the present secretary of the International Leg Cricket Council and Leg Cricket Federation of India.

== Specifications ==
Leg cricket is played between two teams of 11 players. It is played on a circular ground with a radius between 80 and 120 feet. The pitch is 8 feet (2.4 m) wide and 42 to 48 feet (13 to 15 m) long, (depending on the age group and category of the players). The distance in stumps is 12 inches (304.8 mm) (1 foot).

Pitch

Categories	Boys	Girls	Mix
Under-12 Mini	44 feet	44 feet	44 feet
Under-14 Sub Junior	44 feet	44 feet	44 feet
Under-17 Junior	46 feet	46 feet	46 feet
Under-19 Senior	48 feet	48 feet	48 feet
Men's/Women's	48 feet	48 feet	48 feet

Boundary

Categories	Boys	Girls	Mix
Under-12 Mini	70 feet	70 feet	70 feet
Under-14 Sub Junior	80 feet	80 feet	80 feet
Under-17 Junior	90 feet	85 feet	90 feet
Under-19 Senior	100 feet	90 feet	100 feet
Men's/Women's	120 feet	100 feet	120 feet

Stumps

Width of the 3 stumps	12 inches, 1 feet
Height of the 3 stumps	24–30 inches, 2–2.5 feet

== Federation ==
At the international level, leg cricket is governed and promoted by the International Leg Cricket Council, headed by Shri Surender Kumar as President and Shri Joginder Prasad Verma as secretary general. In India, the Leg Cricket Federation of India is the apex governing body, which was formed in 2011. It is registered under Societies Registration Act, 1860 and affiliated with the International Leg Cricket Council. Apart from India, leg cricket is also popular and actively played in several other South Asian countries, including Nepal, Bhutan, Sri Lanka, and Pakistan.

== Competitions ==
National Championship in India:

In July 2012, the Senior National T-10 Leg Cricket Championship was organised by the Leg Cricket Federation of India at Rajiv Gandhi Stadium in Bawana, Delhi where a total of 24 teams of boys and girls participated. Surender Kumar, M.L.A. & Parliamentary Secretary to C.M., Delhi was the Chief Guest of Opening Ceremony and Satpal Singh, an Olympic wrestler and the president of the School Games Federation of India was the chief guest of second day's championship. Since 2012, the Leg Cricket Federation of India has organized six national games in various cities and states in India, such as Delhi, Maharashtra, Tamil Nadu, Jharkhand, Haryana, Uttar Pradesh, and Madhya Pradesh.

International Championships:

India was the winner of the first Indo-Nepal T-10 Leg Cricket Series, which was held in July 2013.

The 5th National T20 leg Cricket Championship was held at Mathura in Uttar Pradesh.

In January 2017, Karnataka won by securing 211 runs, and Odisha secured 3rd position in the 5th National T10 Leg Cricket Championship, held in New Delhi. Chandan Ray is the former captain of the Indian leg cricket team.

== See also ==
- Kickball, a similar bat-free adaptation of baseball.
- Sport in India
- Sports in Nepal
- Sports in Bhutan
- Sport in Sri Lanka
- National Games of India
