= Chandan Ray =

Indian cricketer (born 1998)

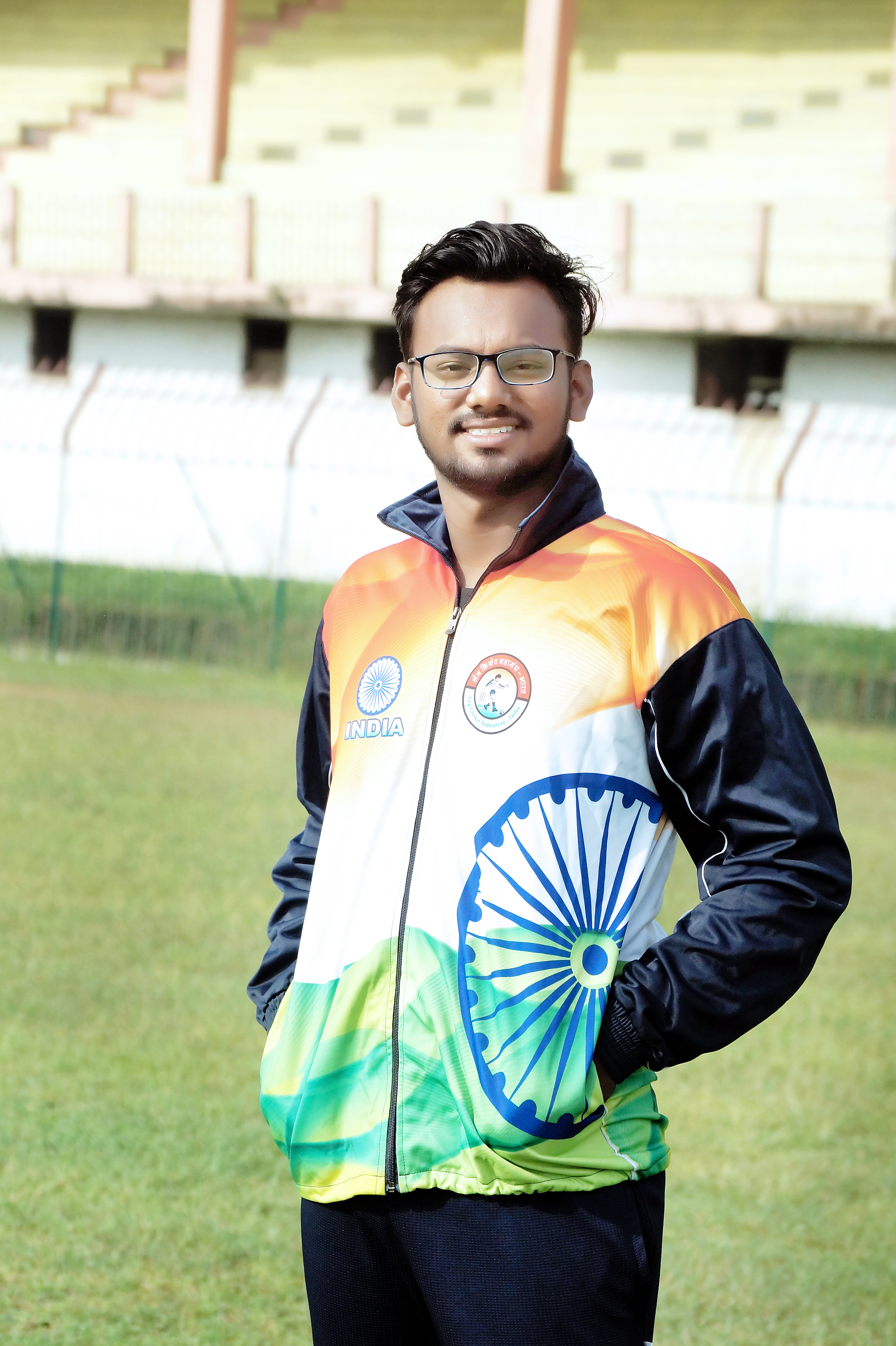
- Ray In May 2016
- Born: August 29, 1998 (age 27); Attabira, Odisha, India
- Known for: Leg Cricket

Chandan Ray (born August 29, 1998) is an Indian leg cricketer, who is the former captain of the Indian leg cricket team. He made his international debut in July 2013 against Nepal. Ray captained the Indian team which lifted the 1st Indo-Nepal T-10 Leg Cricket Series in 2013 and the South Asian Championship, held in Nepal in 2016. He was awarded the Khel Gaurav Award in 2016 by LCFI, SSCAF and IROA.

== Early life ==
Ray belongs to the Bargarh district of Odisha.

== Career ==
He made his debut in the 2nd Senior National T10 championship, held in Ambala, Haryana in May 2013. He was made captain for the Indo-Nepal Leg Cricket Series held at Kathmandu in 2013. Under his captaincy, India won the 1st Indo-Nepal T-10 Leg Cricket Series in July 2013 and was runners-up at the 1st South Asian Championship at Kathmandu, Nepal in 2016. In January 2017, he played for Odisha Leg Cricket team, which secured 3rd position in the 5th National T10 Leg Cricket Championship, held in New Delhi. In November 2018, under his captaincy, Odisha won the 8th National Leg Cricket Tri- Series Championship, defeating Telangana by 140 runs.

== See also ==
- Leg Cricket
- Lists of Indian cricketers
- List of people from Odisha
