= Maram Pitti =

Maram Pitti, also known as Picchi Banti (పిచ్చి బంతి) in Telugu, is an Indian version of dodgeball. It is played with a rubber ball or tennis ball and is often played by a small group, usually 5-6 players, in a small enclosed area or bylanes. The game can also be played solo, in pairs, or in teams of 3 or more players.

== Game ==
The person in possession of the ball hits others without moving from their position. The game continues until only one player remains, who is declared the winner. In some cases, when there are a large number of players, two winners may be chosen at the end. The game begins with a player throwing the ball directly into the air, and the ball must bounce three times before the player picks it up. Generally, hits to the head are not allowed.

== Etymology ==
Maram means "to hit" and Pitti which is pitna means "to strike". Picchim means "Mad" in Telugu and Banti means "ball".
