= Funnel ball =

Outdoor playset

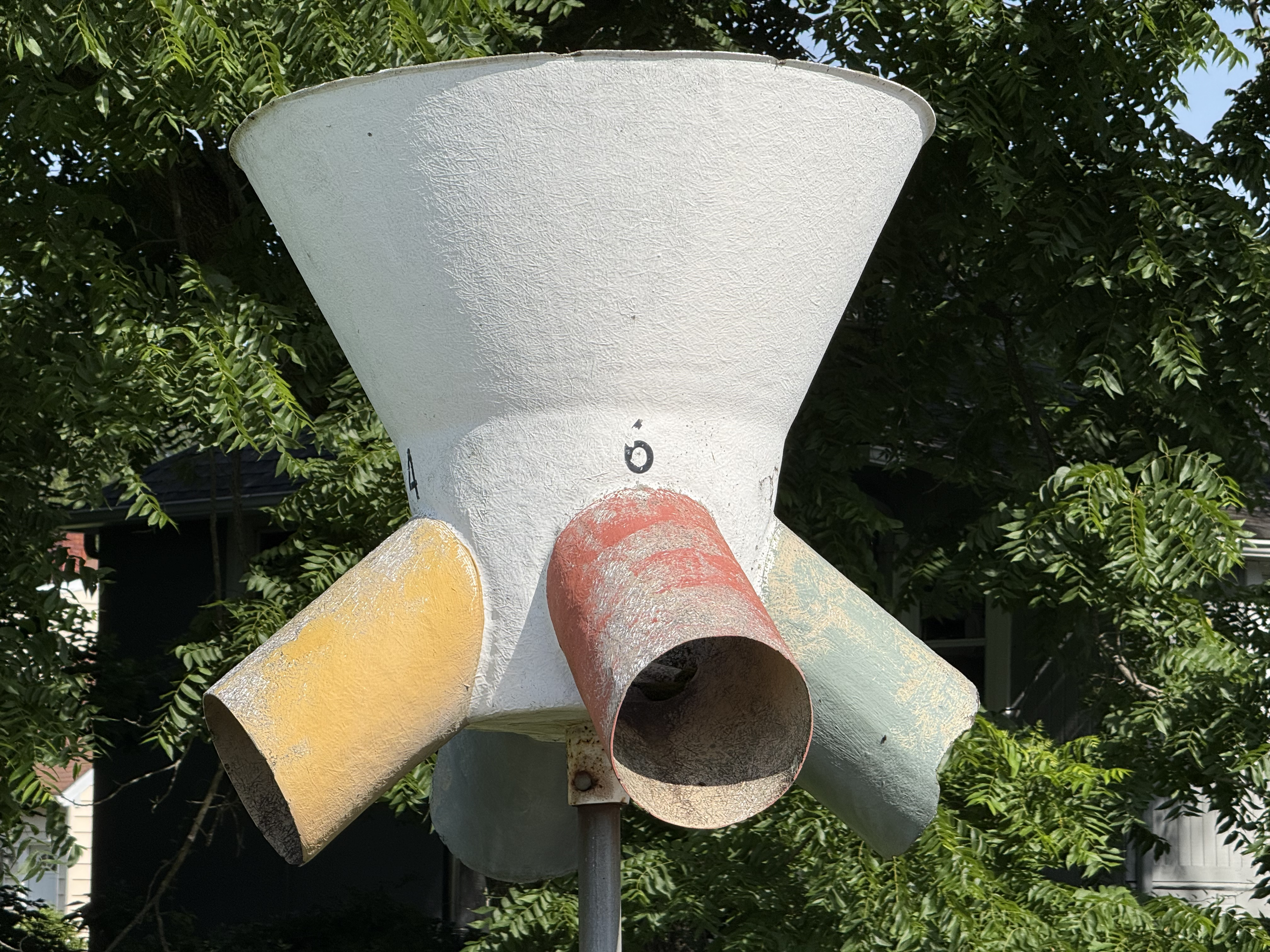
An old funnel ball setup

Funnel ball is a playground game where a ball is thrown into a funnel with multiple exit holes.

A relatively large fiberglass or plastic funnel, roughly five feet (1.5 m) in diameter with a 50 degree pitch, is placed atop a post. The exits of the funnel are multiple one-foot-diameter (0.30 m) holes or tubes, projected parallel to the ground, and spaced equally around the bottom. Play consists of tossing a ball (such as a basketball or small medicine ball) into the mouth of the funnel and waiting for it to exit through one of the holes. Each hole is marked with a point value, e.g. 2, 4, 6, and 10 points. The ball usually rolls around inside the funnel for a short time, making the outcome of the shot nearly random, and shots which exit through the desired hole are unlikely.

There is no formal score to which games are played, and games can be played with high score winner or low score winner. Both team and "every-player-for-themselves" games are commonplace. There are four players that play in the circle and up to 12 players that wait in line.

Funnel Ball was invented by an employee of BCI Burke playground equipment company in 1972.
