= World Dodgeball Association =

World governing body for the sport of dodgeball

The World Dodgeball Association, also known as WDA, is the world governing body for the sport of dodgeball. World Dodgeball Association (WDA) was granted observer status by the Global Association of International Sports Federations in 17 April 2020. The WDA regulates dodgeball events and competitions globally and also sets the rules guiding the sport.

== See also ==
- World Dodgeball Federation
