= Dodgeball World Championship =

Dodgeball competition

- Sport: Dodgeball
- Founded: 2012; 14 years ago
- First season: Dodgeball World Championship
- Continent: International (World Dodgeball Federation (WDBF)
- Website: worlddodgeballfederation.com/

The Dodgeball World Championship is a dodgeball competition for both men's and women's national teams. The event is organised by the World Dodgeball Federation, the sport's global governing body.

It was initially an open event, but this stopped as membership of the organisation grew, and now works by qualification. In 2021, WDBF's membership reached 80 members, all also members of the relevant continental federations.

While foam balls were the only type used in previous editions, since 2022 the Dodgeball World Championship has been contested in two categories: foam and cloth.

The eleventh world championship competition will be held in Bangkok in December 2026.

== Winners ==
Below is a list of winners since the first event in 2012.

Number	Year	Host	Men (foam)	Women (foam)	Mixed (foam)	Men (cloth)	Women (cloth)	Mixed (cloth)
1	2012	Kuala Lumpur (Malaysia)	Hong Kong (1st title)	Canada (1st title)				
2	2013	Queenstown (New Zealand)	Canada (1st title)	Canada (2nd title)				
3	2014	Hong Kong	Canada (2nd title)	United States (1st title)				
4	2015	Las Vegas (United States)	United States (1st title)	United States (2nd title)				
5	2016	Melbourne (Australia)	Canada (3rd title)	Malaysia (1st title)				
6	2017	Toronto (Canada)	Malaysia (1st title)	Malaysia (2nd title)				
7	2018	Los Angeles (United States)	Malaysia (2nd title)	United States (3rd title)				
8	2019	Cancun (Mexico)	United States (2nd title)	United States (4th title)				
*	2020-2021	Cancelled due to COVID-19						
9	2022	Edmonton (Canada)	Malaysia (3rd title)	Canada (3rd title)	Canada (1st title)	Great Britain (1st title)	Austria (1st title)	Austria (1st title)
*	2023	From 2022 onwards, World Championships are held every two years						
10	2024	Graz (Austria)	United States (3rd title)	Canada (4th title)	Canada (2nd title)	Austria (1st title)	Austria (2nd title)	Austria (2nd title)
*	2025	Not held						
11	2026	Bangkok (Thailand)	TBC	TBC	TBC	TBC	TBC	TBC

== Medal table ==
=== Men (foam) ===
Team	Wins
Canada	3
Malaysia	3
United States	3
Hong Kong	1

=== Women (foam) ===
Team	Wins
United States	4
Canada	4
Malaysia	2

=== Mixed (foam) ===
Team	Wins
Canada	2

=== Men (cloth) ===
Team	Wins
Great Britain	1
Austria	1

=== Women (cloth) ===
Team	Wins
Austria	2

=== Mixed (cloth) ===
Team	Wins
Austria	2
