= World Dodgeball Federation =

Sports governing body

- Abbreviation: WDBF
- Region served: Worldwide
- Website: Official website

The World Dodgeball Federation (WDBF) is the world governing body for the sport of dodgeball. Amongst its responsibilities are to run the Dodgeball World Championship since 2012. The WDBF is an international member of The Association for International Sport for All (TAFISA).

== History ==
Formed in 2011, the organisation sought to unite different continents into one federation. In 2012, the first Dodgeball World Championship was held in Kuala Lumpur.

In 2021, WDBF's membership reached 80 members, all also members of the relevant continental federations.

While earlier editions of the Dodgeball World Championship only included foam, starting with 2022, a cloth category was created.

== Responsibilities ==
WDBF is responsible for organising the Dodgeball World Championship. It was initially an open event, but stopped being an open event as the membership grew, and now works by qualification.

== Rules and technical development ==
The World Dodgeball Federation establishes international competition rules for both foam and cloth dodgeball. Its regulations address playing equipment, court specifications, match procedures and officiating standards. The federation maintains separate rulesets for the two formats, which are used at WDBF-sanctioned competitions.

In May 2026, the federation introduced revised international rules following consultations with athletes, referees, continental confederations, national federations and technical officials. The changes were intended to improve consistency in officiating, clarify the interpretation of playing rules, strengthen athlete safety and align international competitions more closely with continental events. The updated framework continued to recognise both foam and cloth dodgeball.

The federation's Technical Committee is responsible for reviewing competition regulations, proposing amendments and supporting the training of coaches and referees. For its 2025–2027 term, the committee established separate working groups for foam and cloth dodgeball, with an emphasis on improving consistency in the cloth format and clarifying the foam ruleset.

== See also ==
- World Dodgeball Association
