= Dodgeball =

Team sport

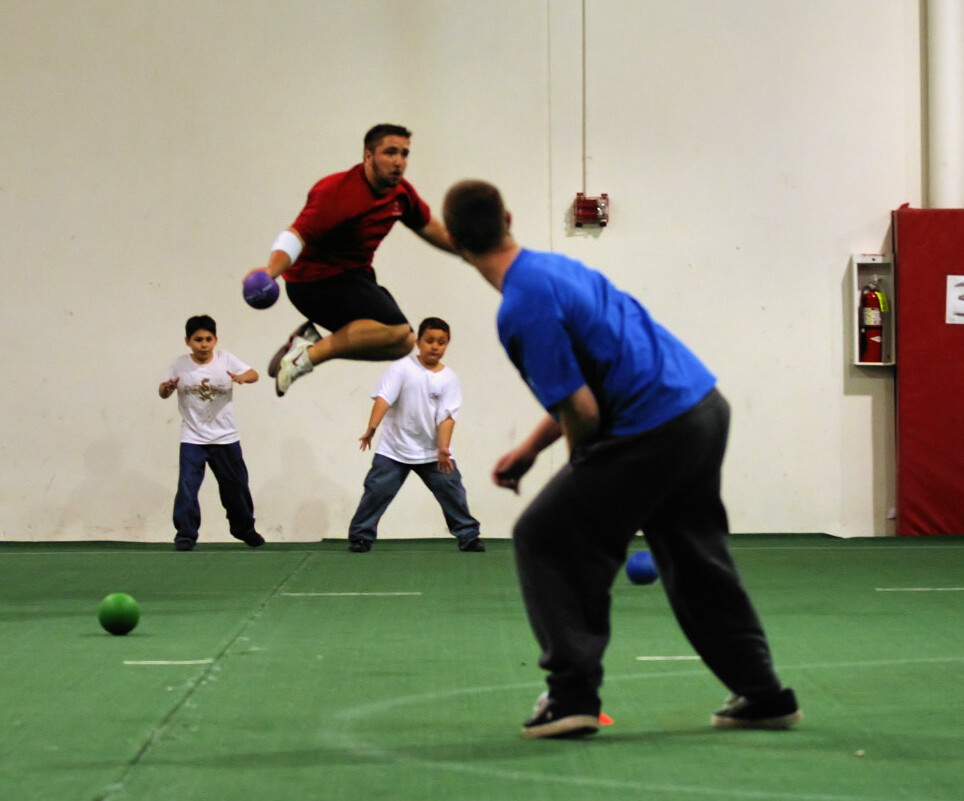
- Highest governing body: World Dodgeball Association and World Dodgeball Federation

Characteristics
- Contact: No
- Team members: 6 per side
- Equipment: Dodgeball (utility ball)
- Venue: Dodgeball court

Presence
- Olympic: No
- Paralympic: No

Dodgeball is a team sport in which players on two opposing teams try to throw balls and hit opponents while avoiding being hit themselves. The objective of each team is to eliminate all members of the opposing team by hitting them with thrown balls, catching a ball thrown by an opponent, or inducing an opponent to commit a violation, such as stepping outside the court.

The sport is mostly played in schools under varying rules, and also formally as an international sport, under rules that vary among international governing bodies, such as the World Dodgeball Federation (WDBF), which runs the Dodgeball World Championship and the World Dodgeball Association (WDA). USA Dodgeball is the governing entity for dodgeball in the United States, with member leagues and clubs across the nation.

== Equipment ==
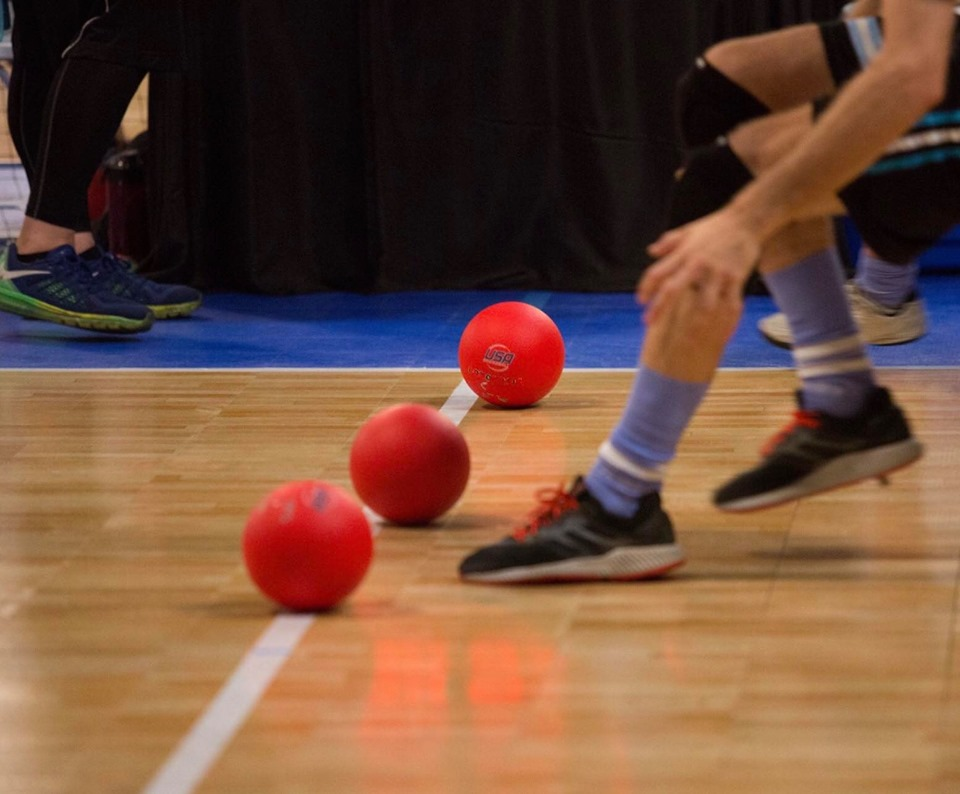
WDBF foam dodgeballs used at the Dodgeball World Championship

There are many different ball types used around the world, including 8.5-inch (220 mm) rubber, "no-sting" rubber, foam and cloth; versions made with rubber or polyvinyl chloride are termed utility balls. USA Dodgeball uses all ball types across multiple tournaments held by them and their member organizations. The World Dodgeball Federation (WDBF) used primarily foam for their first World Championships, but starting with 2022, both cloth and foam categories were introduced.

The WDBF specifies the use of six balls with six players per side for their World Championships. Various rule sets governing number of balls and players are used around the world depending on the court size, level of play, and the organization's discretion.

The WDA specifies the use of five balls; certain national rule sets, such as in Austria, specify six. Amateur games typically use from three to ten balls, the number tailored to the size of the court and the number of players. More balls generally adds to the amount of action in a game, but can result in stalemate with many blocks. If there are too few balls, the element of stealth is removed, as players can see all the balls that might hit them.

== Court ==
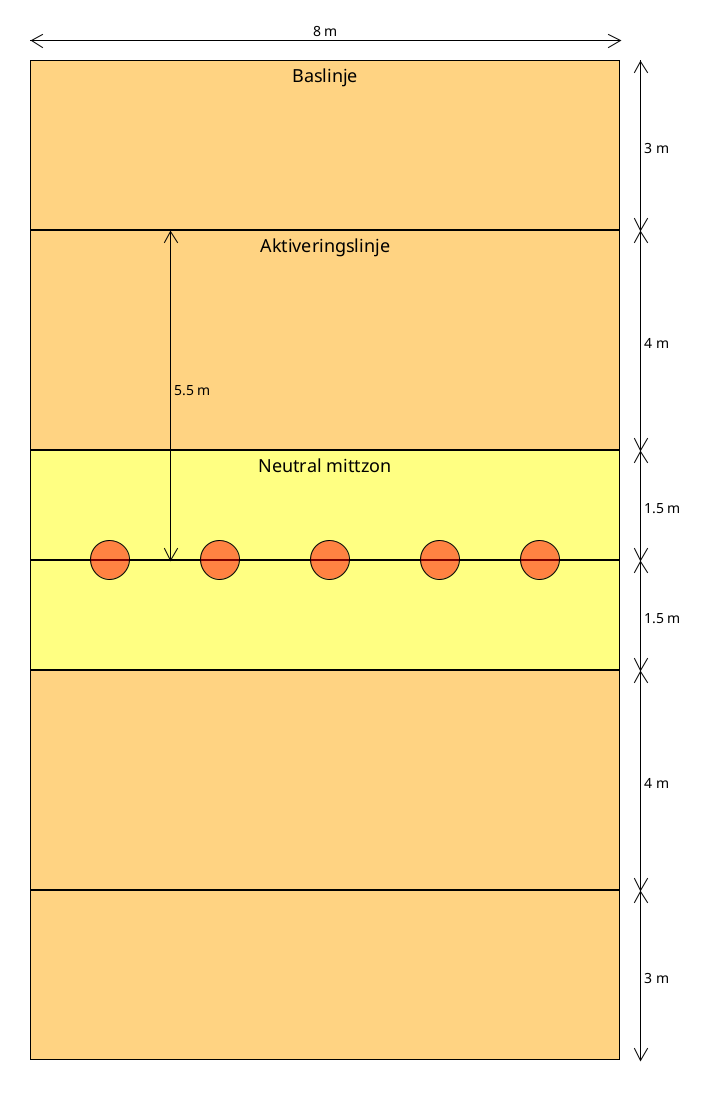
Dodgeball court used by World Dodgeball Association

Dodgeball can be played on any surface that has clearly marked boundaries and a center line, such as a basketball or volleyball court or fenced area. Elite Dodgeball specifies a court 50 feet (15 m) by 25 feet (7.6 m), where a zone 10 feet (3.0 m) wide at the junction of the areas is a neutral zone.

Games can also be played outdoors on a soccer pitch or football field. The WDBF organizes games on beaches and USA Dodgeball hosts tournaments at trampoline parks. WDBF specifies a court 60 feet (18 m) by 30 feet (9.1 m) with no neutral zone.

The attacking lines and center lines are of vital importance. A team can stand in its attacking area and throw the balls to opponents.

== Matchplay ==
=== Length of game ===
Informal matches of dodgeball are typically played until all players on one side are out. In WDBF guidelines, matches last a total of 40 minutes. These are split into two 20-minute halves, during which as many sets as possible are played. A set lasts until all players on one side are out. One point is awarded for every set won. Teams switch sides at halftime.

=== Starting the game ===
Starting play in Dodgeball

In informal dodgeball, balls are initially distributed to players by one of the following methods:

- By even distribution to the two teams.
- By being lined up on the central dividing line.

In this latter option, players then rush toward the center line to grab one of the balls. This is called the opening rush. It is never legal to immediately throw such a ball at an opponent; a player grabbing a ball on the center line retreats or throws it back to a teammate. In WDBF regulations, the ball must be returned behind an "attack line", roughly a third of the way from the back of court. Players may only run for the balls on the left side of the court, while the middle ball will be contested.

=== Gameplay ===
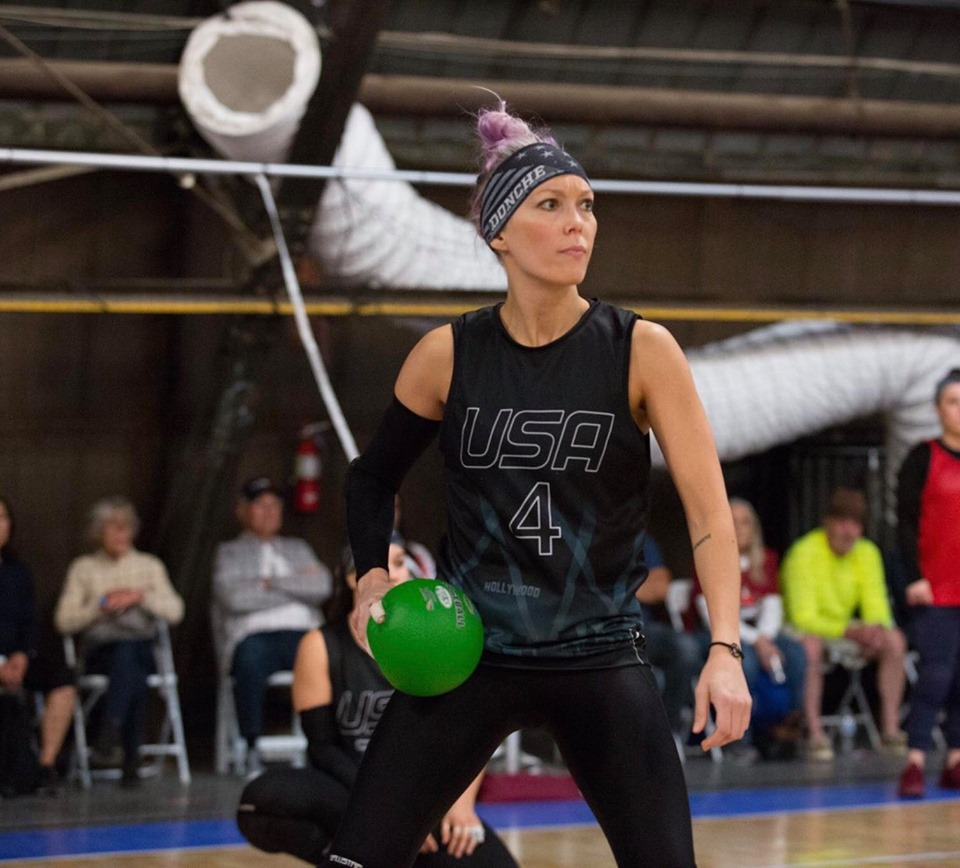
Azalea Donche, preparing to counter at the World Dodgeball Championships in Los Angeles in 2018

Following distribution, players aim to hit one another. A ball is considered "live" from the moment it leaves a player's hand up until it touches the floor, wall, or ceiling, when it becomes "dead". If a player is hit by an opponent's live ball, they are "out"; if the ball is dead, there is no hit. If a player catches a live ball, the opponent who threw the ball is out and a player on the catcher's team is "revived" from the outbox; however, if they fail to secure the catch, leading to them dropping the ball, the failed catcher is out.

In WDBF regulations, players may "block" a throw with another ball. In this situation, the thrown ball remains live, as it has not hit the floor or a wall, and so can be caught or can still hit a player out. If the blocker drops the ball used to block, they have failed to keep their ball secure and are out.

Dead balls that leave the court can only be returned to players by each team's designated ball retrievers. Stepping outside the court, including stepping on a boundary line or entering the opponents' zone, is a violation. Other violations include kicking a ball, displaying bad sportsmanship, and stalling (having a ball for over ten seconds and doing nothing with it). The penalty is that the violator is out.

=== Optional rules ===
Optional rules may be in effect in informal games of dodgeball or in open matches by agreement:

1. "Head shots" (thrown balls that hit an opposing player in the head) may either result in the thrower being out, or the person being hit being out, or neither.
2. In "jailball", players who are out go to "jail" behind the opponents' back line. They can return to the game if they:
  - Capture a dead ball, or
  - Capture a dead ball and throw it and hit an opponent.
3. In games played on a basketball court, thrown balls that hit the backboard or go into the goal (even if deflected by a player or another ball) may have special status, such as returning all eliminated teammates to the court.
4. When there are so few players on the court that dodging the ball is easy, "No Lines" may be declared. This means that there are no team zones; players can go anywhere on the court to get a better shot at an opponent.
5. Rules may also vary regarding what happens when a ball is caught. In some variations, the thrower is out but no teammate of the catcher is revived, and in others, the thrower is not even out.

== Tactics ==
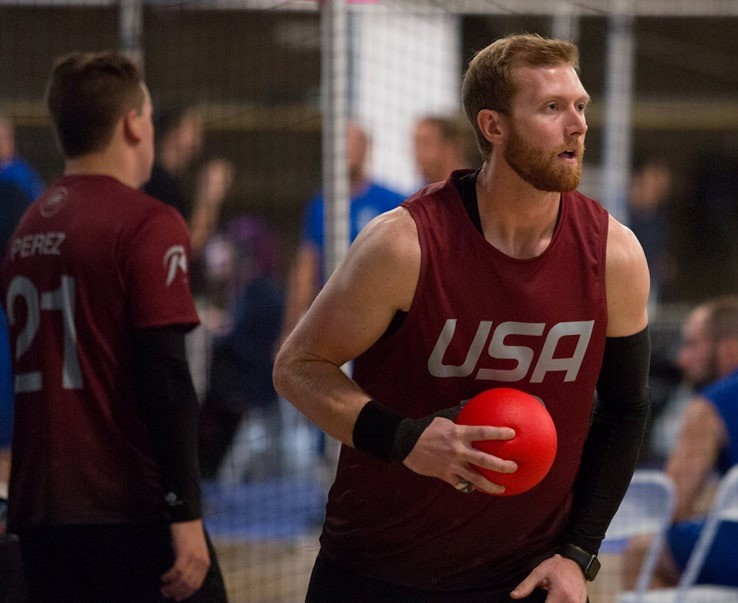
Clutching the ball with one hand

The following basic tactics are useful:

- Thrower location: Move toward the neutral zone to attack; stay on the back line when not attacking. Do not stand in another player's line of sight. Do not turn your back to the opponents.
- Coordinated attack: Call out to teammates to coordinate multiple attacks on the same opponent, preferably from very different angles. Number the opponents, left-to-right, and call out an attack target by number.
- Throwing technique: Throw with one hand. Aim below the waist to avoid getting caught or making a head shot. Throw when the opponent is distracted. Learn to throw balls so that they curve.

Many local teams and international teams develop their own tactics and calling systems specific to their style of play. These become more complex in higher leagues, which often requires specific training for the players in calling positions such that they can make rapid, tactical decisions.

== Competitions ==
The main dodgeball competition is the Dodgeball World Championship, held by the World Dodgeball Federation (WDBF). The competition takes place annually since 2012. It was initially an open event, but stopped being an open event as the membership grew, and now works by qualification. In 2021, WDBF's membership reached 80 members, all also members of the relevant continental federations.

== Variations ==
=== Circle dodgeball ===
In some elementary schools in the United States, a version is played using a circular court. The team outside the circle has the ball or balls, and the team inside must evade the thrown balls. The players who are hit with the ball may change places with the person who hit them, or they may be out of the game and the last person remaining unhit may be the winner. There are variants.

=== Similar games in other countries ===
- A game similar to dodgeball was reportedly played by Mongol warriors after the Battle of Mohi in 1241, using the severed heads of defeated Hungarians.
- In Germany the Game is known as Völkerball or Zweifelderball. It originated as a war-simulating Game between two "peoples" (Völker meaning peoples). It is nowadays the most common teamsport played in German, Austrian and Swiss Schools. There is a Strulle (also Strohmann, König or Freigeist) on each side of the Field, who tries to throw the Ball towards the Players. When he succeeded, the gotten Player has to retreat to the side, where his Strulle is located. If the thrown-out Player himself throws the ball at an opponent Player, he is allowed back onto his Field. If all field Players are thrown out, the Strulle walks onto the Field and has 3 "Lives".
- In Sweden, there is a version called killerboll ("killer ball") where the player who has the ball is limited to three steps before throwing. Whoever is hit by the ball may return to the game if the player who knocked them out is hit.
- In Iran, this game has long been one of the common cultural theses called "vassati" (وسطی). People of every age group are familiar with the game and especially they play it when going on a picnic. A player from the middle team who is hit by the ball is out of the game and the game continues in each set until all the players in the middle team get out of the field, although the player who is out can return to the game when their teammates catch the ball.
- On the Indian subcontinent, a variation of the game is played called "Sekan-tadi" (सेकन-तड़ी). This is slang used for "slamming the hip." Other names are Eri Pantu (Tamil: எறி பந்து), Gend Tadi and Maram Pitti.
- In China, a variation of the game is played called "Diu Sha Bao" (丢沙包). Instead of a ball, the game is played with a small round sand bag, which is also known as the "Sha Bao" (沙包).
- In Belgium and The Netherlands, a variation is known as "Tussen Twee Vuren" ("Between Two Fires"), which is commonly played in schools. It is also called "trefbal" (hit ball).
- In Poland, a variation is known as "Dwa Ognie" ("Two Fires"), which used to be common in schools.
- In Afrikaans South African schools, a variation named "brandbal" (burning ball) is played with a tennis ball inside a designated area such as a rugby field or tennis court. The objective is for the person in possession of the ball to hit any other player with the ball, in which case the person last hit becomes the next one chasing and hitting the others. A secondary objective is to hit players by throwing as hard as possible, leading to the "burning" sensation.
- In Brazil, dodgeball is known as queimado and usually features rules similar to jailball, including players that go out to "jail" behind the opponents' back line. It can be played with a single ball as well.
- In Estonia the game is called "rahvastepall"—"the nationsball". It is played with one ball.

== Criticism ==
The notion that gameplay resembles assault or is too aggressive has led to lawsuits and calls to eliminate the game from school physical education programs.

== See also ==
- Dodgeball ranking
- U.S. intercollegiate dodgeball champions
