= Pick-up game =

Game spontaneously started by a group of players

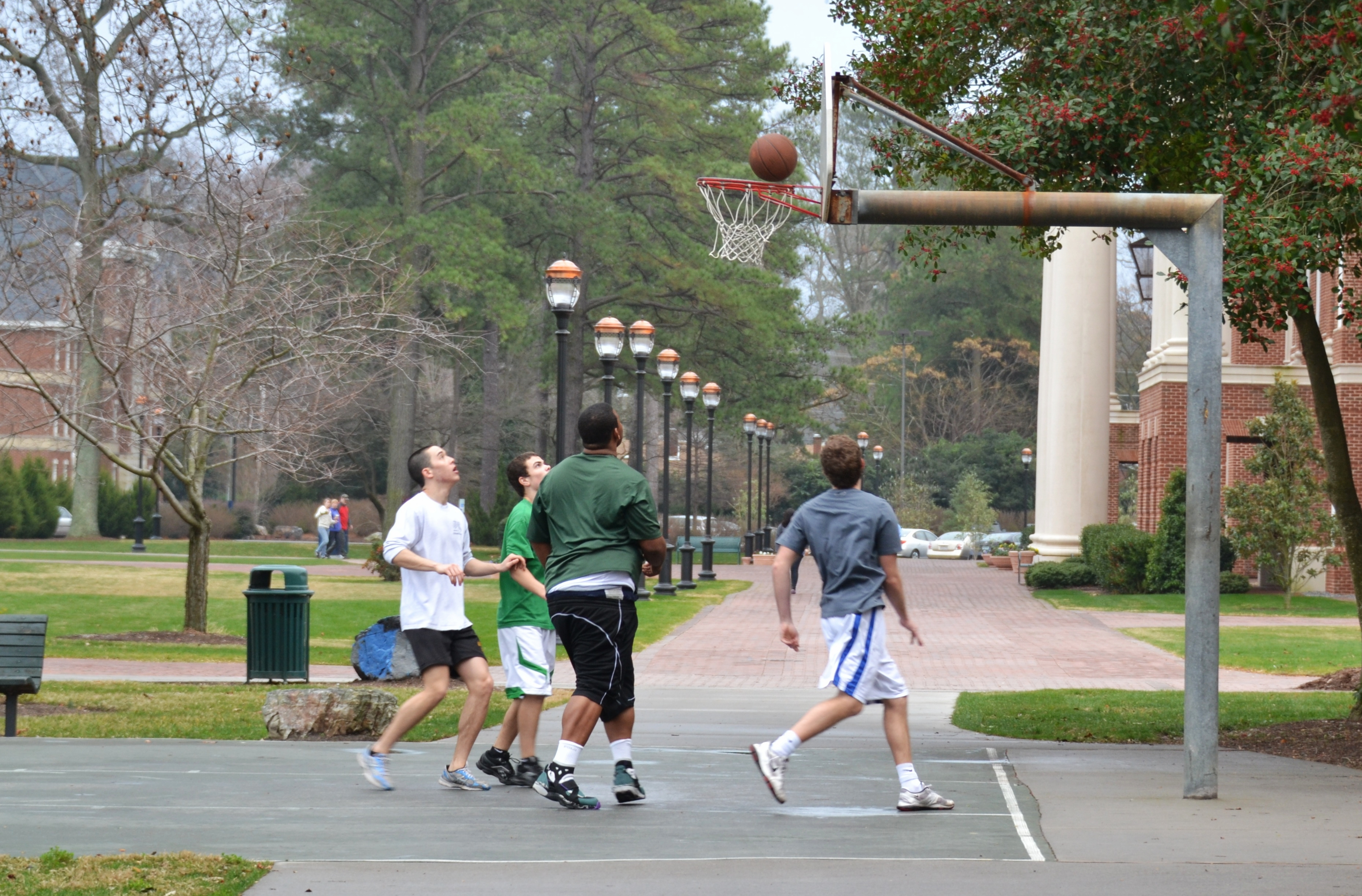
Four players in a game of pick-up basketball

In sports and video games, a pick-up game (also known as a scratch game or PUG) is a game that has been spontaneously started by a group of players. Players are generally invited to show up beforehand, but unlike exhibition games, there is no sense of obligation or commitment to play. Pick-up games usually lack officials and referees, which makes them more disorganized and less structured than regular games. Without formal rules and regulations, pick-up games are often played with a less rigid set of rules. The original sports may also be modified to accommodate the environment, such as using one basketball hoop instead of two, or a smaller number of players, such as a one-on-one soccer match.

== Types ==
- Amateur sports
- British Bulldog (game)
- Corkball
- French cricket
- Fuzzball
- Pick-up basketball
- Indian Ball
- Sandlot ball
- Stickball
- Street basketball
- Street cricket
- Street football
- Street football (American)
- Street hockey
- Tapeball
- Shinny
- Shirts versus skins
- Vitilla

== See also ==
- Amateur sports
