= Forms of cricket =

Various aspects of the sport

Cricket is a multi-faceted sport with different formats, depending on the standard of play, the desired level of formality, and the time available. One of the main differences is between matches limited by time in which the teams have two innings apiece, and those limited by number of over's in which they have a single innings each. The former, known as first-class cricket if played at the senior level, has a scheduled duration of three to five days (there have been examples of "timeless" matches too); the latter, known as limited overs cricket because each team bowls a limit of typically 50 overs, has a planned duration of one day only. A separate form of limited overs is Twenty20, originally designed so that the whole game could be played in a single evening (3 hours), in which each team has an innings limited to twenty overs.

Double innings matches usually have at least six hours of playing time each day, with formal intervals on each day for lunch and tea, and additional brief informal breaks for drinks. There is also a short interval between innings. Limited overs matches often last at least six hours, with similar intervals and breaks, whilst the more streamlined Twenty20 matches are generally completed in under four hours. T10 cricket is a newer version of the game, based on the principles of other limited overs formats, but with only 10 overs per innings, and the total playing time limited to 90 minutes.

Local club cricket teams, which consist of amateur players, rarely play matches that last longer than a single day; these may loosely be divided into

- declaration matches, in which a specified maximum time or number of overs is assigned to the game in total and the teams swap roles only when the batting team is either completely dismissed or declares
- limited overs matches, in which a specified maximum number of overs is assigned for each team's innings individually. These will vary in length between 30 and 60 overs per side at the weekend and the 20-over format in the evenings.

Indoor cricket is a variant of the sport played in sports halls during the winter months.

At still lower levels, the rules are often changed simply to make the game playable with limited resources, or to render it more convenient and enjoyable for the participants. Informal variants of the sport can be played almost anywhere, if there is enough space.

== Professional cricket ==
There are 5 forms of cricket that have been played at what may be termed the highest international or domestic level of the game. Three are contested currently and one is historic. There is no official term for this level of cricket collectively, although the individual forms do have official designations and are defined by the International Cricket Council (ICC). In the past, before any official definition was agreed upon, highest standard matches were routinely described as "great" or "important" or "top-class"; or even "first-class" before this became the official term for one type of cricket (see below). Note that "minor cricket" is a term used officially in England and Wales at least.

Matches played at the highest international and domestic levels are those in which players and/or teams of a recognized high standard are taking part. In modern domestic cricket, it includes first-class cricket, List A cricket and top-class Twenty20 competitions for both men and women. Test cricket, One Day Internationals (ODIs) and Twenty20 Internationals (T20Is) are variations of those forms within the international sphere. Historically (see History of cricket), top-class matches were those held by substantial sources to have historical significance including single wicket and those double innings matches without statistical significance: i.e., lacking scorecards and other statistical data.

The oldest known English county teams are Kent, Surrey and Sussex, all of which have histories commencing in the early 18th century. These counties had achieved a high standard long before their modern county clubs were founded (from 1839 to 1845), and so they have always had first-class status. Following a meeting in May 1894 of Marylebone Cricket Club (MCC) and the County Championship clubs, the concept of "first-class cricket" was officially defined. By 1895, several other counties had also been recognized as having first-class status, as had MCC itself from its foundation in 1787. Top-class limited overs cricket began in 1963 when the County Championship clubs took part in the first seasonal knockout tournament, which was won by Sussex. Hence, like all the other first-class counties, Sussex for example is classified as a List A team from 1963; and as a top-class Twenty20 team since 2003.

=== First-class matches ===
First-class cricket is a form of the game in which teams of a recognized high standard compete. Test cricket is first-class at international level; the term "first-class" is habitually applied to domestic matches only, although a player's Test statistics are included in their overall first-class statistics. A first-class match must have eleven players per side, two innings apiece and a scheduled duration of at least three days. Historically, however, there have been instances of first-class matches being arranged for less than three days, and there have been others with twelve or thirteen players per side; these are exceptional cases and form a tiny percentage of the whole. If the game is not completed within the allotted time then it is drawn, regardless of who has scored the most runs when time expires. Limited overs matches in which the teams have only one innings each are not first-class (see List A and Twenty20 sections below) and these cannot result in a draw (they can, however, result in a tie or be declared a "no result").

Test matches, other games between two Test nations, games between two domestic teams deemed first-class in countries holding full membership of the ICC, and games between a Test nation's national side (or a team drawn from a national touring squad) and a first-class domestic team from a Test nation, are deemed to be first-class. A match between a leading ICC associate member and another team adjudged first-class would be granted first-class status, but domestic matches in the associate member country are minor.

The origin of the term "first-class cricket" is unknown but, along with other terms, it was used loosely for top-class eleven-a-side matches before it acquired its official status in 1894 (see above). Subsequently, at a meeting of the Imperial Cricket Conference (ICC) in May 1947, it was formally defined on a global basis. A key omission of both the MCC and ICC rulings was any attempt to define first-class cricket retrospectively and it was stipulated in the ICC ruling that the definition "will not have retrospective effect". Many historians and statisticians have subjectively classified chosen pre-1895 matches as first-class but these are unofficial ratings and differences of opinion among the experts has led to variations in published cricket statistics. The main problem with "first-class cricket" is that it can be a misleading concept as it is essentially statistical and may typically ignore the historical aspect of a match if statistical information is missing, as is invariably the case with matches played up to 1825. Nevertheless, the recognition of any match as first-class by a substantial source qualifies it as such and it follows that the teams, venues and players involved in such matches before 1895 are the equivalent of first-class teams, venues and players since 1895. Substantial sources interested in 18th and 19th century cricket include Arthur Haygarth, F. S. Ashley-Cooper, H. T. Waghorn, G. B. Buckley, H. S. Altham, Roy Webber, John Arlott, Bill Frindall, the ACS and various internet sites (see Historical sources). Writing in 1951, Roy Webber drew a line between what is important historically and what should form part of the statistical record when he argued that the majority of matches prior to 1864 (i.e., the year in which overarm bowling was legalized) "cannot be regarded as (statistically) first-class" and their records are used "for their historical associations".

=== Limited overs cricket ===
Limited overs cricket played with 40 to 60 overs per team, known statistically as List A cricket, is the second form of cricket which differs from first-class as the teams play one innings each and are allowed a maximum number of overs per innings. Matches are scheduled for completion in a single day's play, though they can in theory continue into a second day if impacted by bad weather. Most cricketing nations have some form of domestic List A competition. The over limits range from forty to sixty. The categorization of "List A" was only endorsed by the ICC in 2006; the Association of Cricket Statisticians and Historians created it for the purpose of providing a parallel to first-class cricket in their record books.

==== 100-ball cricket ====
100-ball cricket is a form of cricket in which each team has an innings of at most 100 legal balls. Ties are, in some cases, broken by having each team play a "Super Five", which is a 5-ball innings for each team. Subsequent Super Fives may be played if the first Super Five is tied. This format is played professionally in The Hundred competition, which started in 2021 in England and Wales.

==== T10 cricket ====
T10 format is a limited-overs evolution of cricket, following the success of the T20 game, with play limited to just 10 overs per team. It was first played from 14 to 17 December 2017 at the Sharjah Cricket Stadium, approved by the Emirates Cricket Board in a professional cricket league owned and launched by T10 Sports Management. Each team has one innings of 10 overs, also time-limited to 90 minutes. The league is played in a round-robin format that is followed by the semifinals and the final. If there is a tie, the result is decided by means of a Super Over. In August 2018, the International Cricket Council (ICC) officially sanctioned the second season of T10 to be held in Sharjah starting on 23 November that year, with six teams competing.

==== Twenty20 cricket ====
Twenty20 is a separate form of limited-overs cricket and is not part of List A. It is the third form of cricket originally devised in England in 2003. The teams have one innings each in which the maximum number of overs is twenty. Twenty20 competitions are held internationally and there are domestic championships, sometimes called franchise cricket in several cricketing nations.

=== Single wicket ===
A match in which, as the name implies, there is a single batsman at any time. It is probably the oldest form of cricket as, at its most basic level, it involves one player against another. Historically, its matches were top-class and it has known periods of huge popularity, especially in the mid-18th century when it was the most popular form of cricket thanks to its gambling associations, and in the first half of the 19th century. Matches can involve teams with a single player only but the lucrative 18th century games were mostly between teams of three to five players known as "threes", "fours" or "fives". Only those players designated as team members can bat or bowl but it is normal to have the full quota of fielders including a wicket-keeper.

==== Double wicket ====
Double-wicket or "pairs" cricket is a form of cricket with two teams of two players each which are pitched against each other for a limited number of overs. A player getting out in this form of cricket does not retire but continues to bat but is penalized a stipulated number of runs for each time he gets out. There have been a number of international double wicket cricket tournaments, between 1978 and 2001.

==== One-vs-One Cricket ====
A very similar format was used in the Ultimate Kricket Challenge, held from 24 December 2020 to 1 January 2021 in Dubai. It was a one-on-one format, with players taking turns bowling 15 ball innings to each other. It was played indoors, and the bowling player was assisted by a wicketkeeper and one fielder, as well as being allowed a substitute bowler for up to 7 balls per innings.

=== Three team cricket ===
Three team cricket, branded as 3TeamCricket (3TC), is an experimental format that was devised by Paul Harris, former CEO of FirstRand Bank. A 3TC match is contested between 3 teams of 8 players each. Teams bat for one innings of 12 overs, split between two 6-over periods, facing one opponent in the first half and the other opponent in the second half.

On 18 July 2020, the 3TC Solidarity Cup became the first 3TeamCricket match to be played. It was held in South Africa as a charity exhibition match.

== Amateur cricket ==
=== Club cricket ===
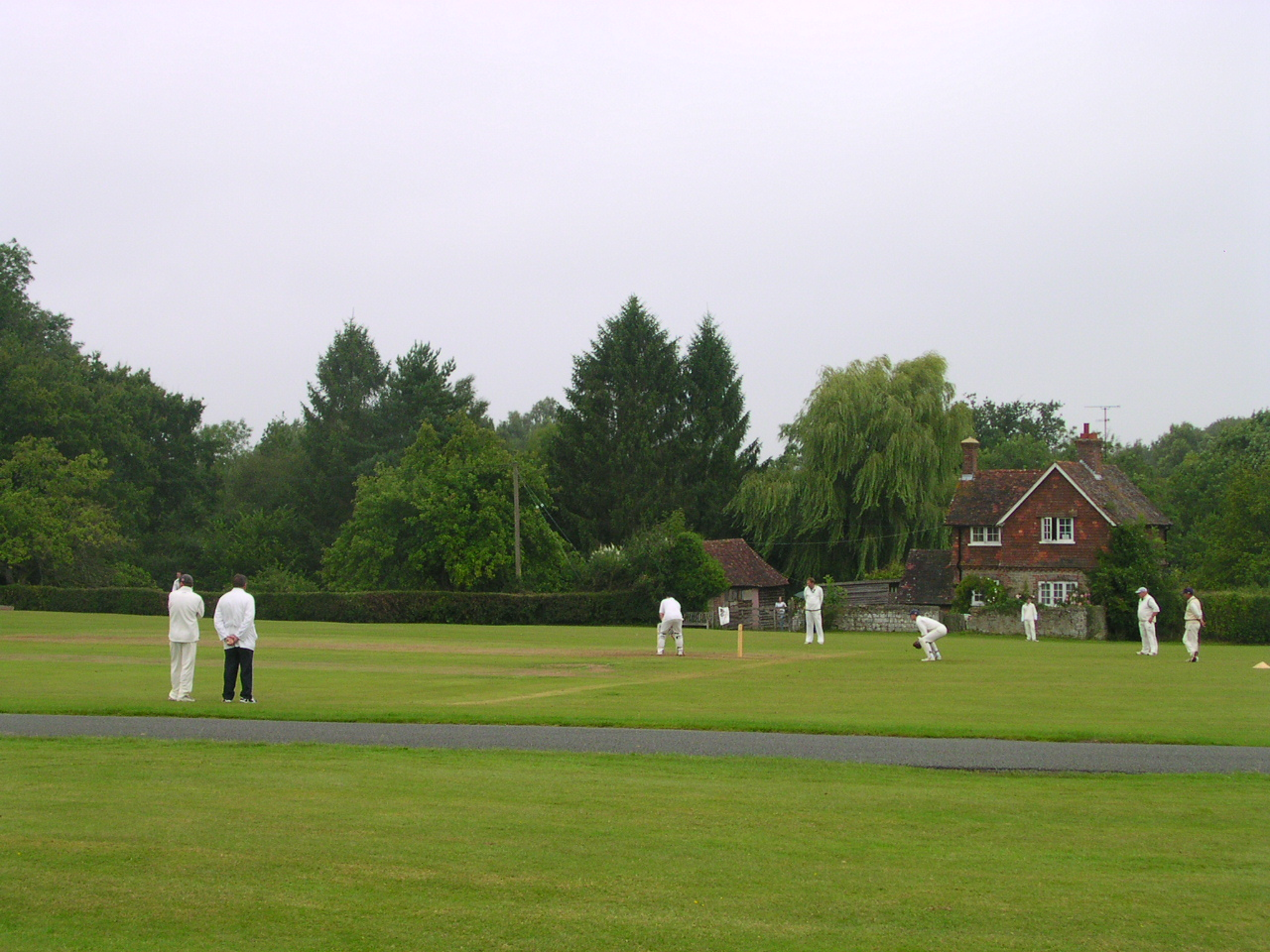
Club cricket is popular amongst amateur players in several countries

Club cricket, by far and away the widest form of cricket played worldwide, is largely amateur, but still formal, cricket, with the teams organised into leagues. The games are sometimes limited-overs, with each innings usually lasting between twenty and fifty overs. Other matches are played to time restrictions. Restrictions in overs or time may be placed on each side individually, or they may stipulate the total length of the match. The latter more traditional case is often known as declaration cricket.

Club cricket is played extensively in cricketing nations, and also by immigrants from cricketing nations. Club cricket most often takes place on a natural grass wicket, often maintained by the players themselves, although at a lower level it may take place on an artificial turf pitch, though the rest of actual field will be natural grass.

There are numerous forms of cricket which, although they are not played professionally or at a recognized high standard, are still popular as common formats of amateur cricket. The double innings, limited overs, Twenty20 and single wicket forms are played by amateur teams: for example, Grade cricket in Australia and the Minor Counties Cricket Championship in England and Wales play the double innings form.

=== Declaration cricket ===
This is the most traditional version of cricket, with rules most closely replicating the original rules of cricket from the 16th and 17th century. It is a single innings game with a set time limit for the entire game to be completed in. To win the game, a side must both score the highest aggregate number of runs and take all ten of the opposition wickets. It is up to the side batting first to declare when they feel they have enough runs to be able to win the match. In this format of cricket, if the side batting second do not lose all ten of their wickets, the match is said to have ended in a draw.

Declaration cricket is generally played over a single day, although two day games lasting an entire weekend are also common. This format is often seen as "old-fashioned" and is typically used for friendly matches rather than in organised league play.

=== Short format cricket ===
Cricket is also played in several different shortened forms, designed to pack as much action as possible into an hour or two, enabling them to be played as a single contest in an evening, or as a series of multiple contests between different teams that cover the entire day. Such forms have evolved since the 1980s, and take cricket an additional step beyond one-day cricket. Most forms will resemble twenty-twenty cricket in nature, although shorter formats with reduced numbers of players, typically 6-aside or 8-aside, are also common for tournament play.

==== Rules ====
Different forms of short format cricket have different rules for certain situations:

- When all but one of a team's batsmen are out:
  - In Last man stands cricket, the last batsman who is not out bats alone, can only run even numbers of runs, and can only make their ground at the striker's end.
  - In six-a-side cricket, the last batsman to be out acts as the nonstriker, while only the not-out batsman can take strike.

=== Blind cricket ===
Blind cricket is a variant for blind and partially sighted players. The most obvious difference is that the ball contains ball bearings so that it can be heard, and that it is rolled along the ground. Blind cricket was invented in 1922, and has been governed by the World Blind Cricket Council since 1996.

=== Indoor cricket ===
Indoor cricket is a format of the game designed to be played in an indoor sports hall at times of the year when outdoor play is not possible. There are two recognized forms of indoor cricket. The traditional version played with a hard ball is popular in the UK. This format is played with six players per side and features modified rules designed specifically for indoor play. A soft ball version is played by junior cricketers in the UK and is also popular among adults in the Southern Hemisphere.

=== Kwik cricket ===
It is a simplified, high-speed version of the game played on a small pitch with plastic equipment, aimed mainly at encouraging youngsters to take part.

=== Table cricket ===
Table Cricket is an indoor version of the game designed primarily for physically challenged cricketers.

=== Walking cricket ===
Walking cricket is a form of cricket for senior players where players are required to not run during the game. Batters who get out are allowed to keep batting, but the bowling team gains five runs per dismissal.

== Informal forms of cricket ==
=== Backyard cricket ===
Backyard cricket, Beach cricket, Street cricket and Garden cricket are all different names used to describe a wide range of related informal games. The rules are often ad hoc, and the laws of cricket, such as those involving leg before wicket, penalty runs, and others, are ignored or modified to suit both the setting and participants' preferences. In India and Pakistan, there is Gali cricket ('gali' in Hindi means 'street'. It is pronounced as 'gully' but should not be confused with the fielding position). Often, there are no teams, and each player plays for himself, and fields when he is not batting. Often, there is one wicket, and one bowling position, and no overs. If the batsman runs a single run, he is allowed to walk back to the wicket before the next ball is bowled.

Informal cricket in the UK is often known as garden cricket and is played in gardens and recreation grounds around the country. Because of limited space in gardens and the potential damage to property, one particular version of garden cricket is unique in that there are no concept of runs as aerial attacking shots are expressly forbidden, and instead, the winning batsman is the one who can survive the longest number of deliveries. Typically this will be played with a tennis ball or other soft bouncy ball, and modified rules, such as one hand one bounce are often employed. The length of the wicket will typically be roughly 15 meters, and the non-bowling fielders will be encircled close round the bat looking for a catching chance. There are quite often other rules such as not out the first ball and not out leg before wicket.

Plaquita and bete-ombro are examples of Latin American versions of street cricket.

=== French cricket ===
It is a game in which the ball is bowled at the legs of the batsman, with the batsman's legs forming the wicket. It is often played by children. A tennis ball is often used rather than the harder cricket ball. Much like beach cricket, the rules may vary wildly.

=== Non-stop (continuous) cricket ===
Continuous cricket is a game involving one batsman, who upon hitting the ball, must run to a marker, which is square of the wicket. The bowler may bowl as soon as the ball is returned, regardless of whether or not the batsman is still running. The game can be played in teams, or as a group, where players rotate between fielding positions, batting and bowling.

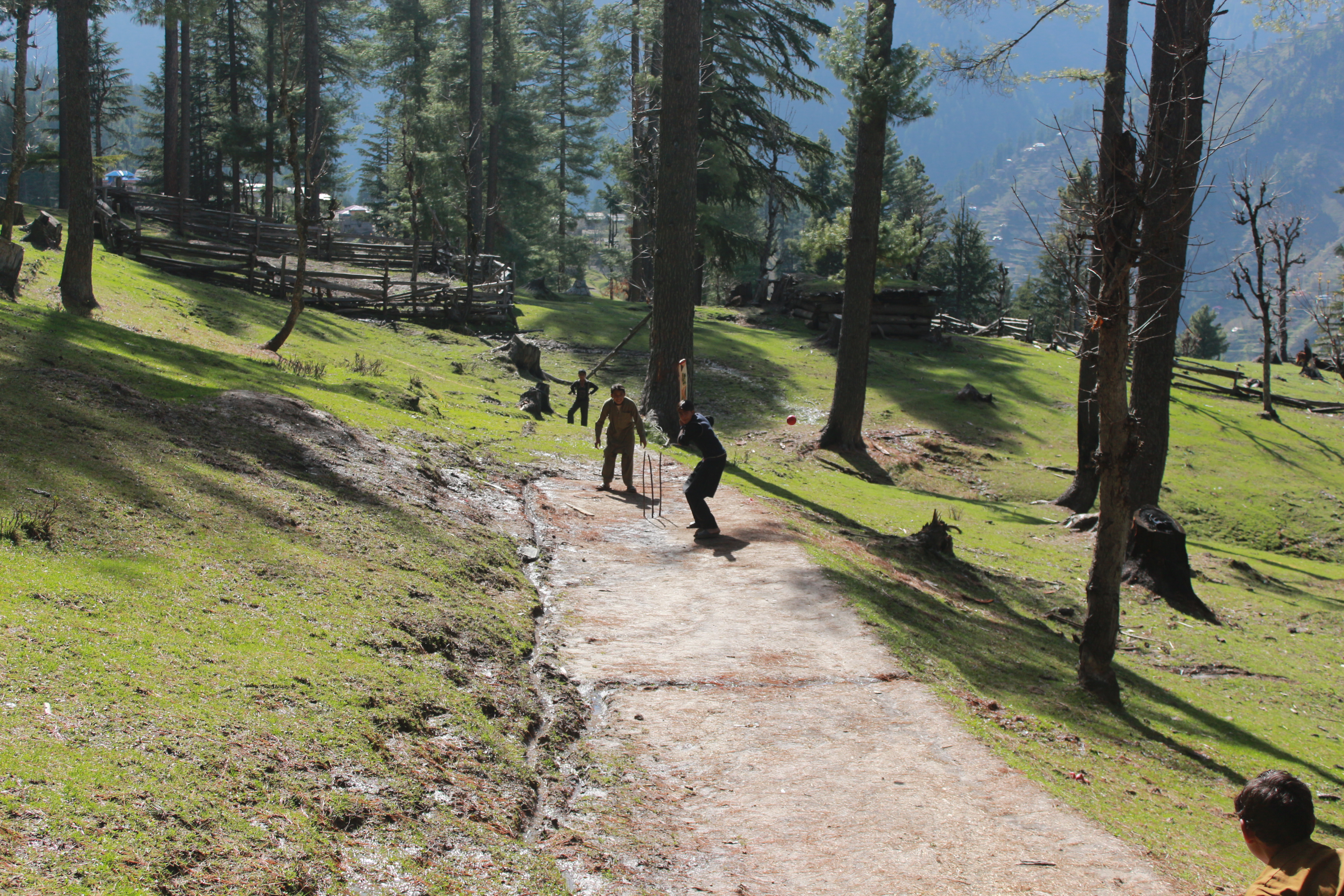
Tape ball cricket is played all over Pakistan

=== Tape ball cricket ===
Tape ball cricket was invented in Karachi, Pakistan as an attempt to replicate the feeling of a standard game. It does so by covering a tennis ball with electrical tape to make it heavier and give it a smoother surface, similar to that of a hard cricket ball, which also creates extra swing in the air. This concept has the added advantage of not requiring any protective gear, which has seen it spread a sometimes exclusive sport to people from all walks of life. Since its inception in the 1960s-70s, it has been enjoyed in several countries and Pakistanis who have settled abroad have introduced the idea to others by founding tape ball leagues in the UK, USA, and Canada. It remains the most popular pastime for many in Pakistan and was named as one of cricket's ten greatest inventions by Wisden in 2020.

=== Tennis ball cricket ===
This type of cricket is popular in the South Asian sub-continent, USA and Canada. In this game a harder version of tennis ball is used. The number of overs in the game varies from 6 to 25 overs. Considering that the ball is not as hard as the professional cricket ball, the use of protective gear like gloves, pads and helmets is optional. As tennis ball cricket games are shorter when compared to the conventional version, it suits the US and Canadian lifestyle where one would see a large number of people participating. Where cricket pitches are not available, part of a baseball diamond is used as a pitch in most parts of USA and Canada.

== Unorthodox forms of cricket ==
=== Ball in Play ===
Ball in Play (BiP) is an indoor form of cricket which includes elements of baseball. It was started by Jomboy Media in collaboration with Major League Cricket in order to help American baseball fans learn cricket.

=== Kilikiti ===
Also known as Kirikiti, or Samoan Cricket, it is the national game of Samoa and is especially popular in New Zealand. The game is descended from the cricket brought to Samoa by British missionaries; teams of unlimited size follow rules opaque to outside observers in a game/dance/feast event that can last several days.

=== Leg cricket ===
Similar to kickball, it is a form of cricket which involves kicking the ball instead of hitting with a bat.

=== Trobriand cricket ===
It is a peculiar form of cricket played in the Trobriand Islands, in Papua New Guinea. Although cricket was introduced by the British as part of colonial agenda, it was adopted into local Trobriand culture and many modifications and cultural adaptations were made over the years. Some of these include: under-arm bowling; outs are celebrated with dances; the "home" team (the tribal community which organised a match) always wins; any number of players can take part in a match; players dress in traditional war costumes.

=== Vigoro ===
It is a form of cricket that also resembles baseball, mainly played by women.

== Cricket simulations without a ball or pitch ==
=== Book cricket ===
Book cricket is played by school children in India, Pakistan, Bangladesh and Sri Lanka. It has several variants and is usually played by 2 teams consisting of 3-4 players each. If there is an odd number of players then the person who is left at the end of distribution of teams can play for both teams and is often called a common player. The runs are scored by flipping a book open at random and counting as the number of runs scored the last digit of the page-number of the verso (the left-side or even-numbered page). 0 and sometimes 8 are assigned special rules: typically a wicket is lost when a person scores 0, and a No-ball run and an additional chance are assigned when a player scores 8. To give an example, if the batting side opened the book at page 26, then 6 runs would be scored. For the toss, both players open a page and the one who scores the higher number of runs wins.

Another version of cricket appeared during the 1950s in the UK in the Eagle comic. A page was chosen and each letter or symbol was counted according to a formula. This produced a scorecard with the majority of innings around 150 to 300 scored at about 4 runs per over.

=== Calculator cricket ===
This form is played by school children who use scientific calculators for maths and science.

A player starts by clearing the memory on their calculator. The player will then use the random number generator on their calculator to bring up a number between 0 and 1. The number of runs scored is the first digit after the decimal point (for example, if the random number generator provides 0.521, 5 runs are scored). Scoring is kept by using the memory addition function on the calculator, or by pen and paper. Scoring a 0 is considered out. The player who has the highest score wins.

=== Hand cricket ===
Hand cricket is played through gestures (called 'throws') similar to rock paper scissors. Throws are made simultaneously by both players, one designated as the batter and the other as the bowler. Runs scored according to the batter's throws until the bowler throws the same, in which case the batter is "out". It is usually played with only one hand. Hand cricket is based on two forms:

• Number Matching

In this form, the total number of fingers extended equates to the equivalent number, with a thumb counting as 6. In some variants, this is the maximum number of runs possible in a throw, but in others, it extends to 10 runs, with 7 indicated by the thumb and index finger, 8 by the thumb, index and middle finger, 9 by the thumb, index, middle, and ring fingers, and 10 by a scrunched up (as opposed to an open) palm. If the number of fingers extended is same, the batter is out.

• Finger matching

In this form, not only number of fingers extended matters but also the type of fingers extended. If both the number and type of fingers extended are same, then the batter is out. For both the forms, a dot ball may be given by not extending none of the fingers.

It is played by school children in India, Sri Lanka and Pakistan. It is a nostalgic game for those who played it during school breaks. At present, certain mobile applications are also available for playing hand cricket.

=== Pencil cricket ===
A one-person game played with pencils marked by hand to function as 'long dice'. A Japanese variant of these for use in other games are called 'battle pencils'. It may also simply be played with conventional dice. The aim is to generate scores and attribute them to imaginary players and teams by compiling a scorecard. The game has been marketed commercially featuring plastic or metal long dice (rollers) and playing rules.

The board game Test Match operates on a similar principle.

=== Pub cricket ===
Also called car cricket. A travel game based on the names of public houses passed on the route. Runs are scored according to the number of legs, arms or other items featured in the pub name. The exact rules vary according to the participants.

== Bibliography ==
- ACS (1981). A Guide to Important Cricket Matches Played in the British Isles 1709 – 1863. Nottingham: ACS.
- ACS (1982). A Guide to First-Class Cricket Matches Played in the British Isles. Nottingham: ACS.
- Birley, Derek (1999). A Social History of English Cricket. Aurum.
- Webber, Roy (1951). The Playfair Book of Cricket Records. Playfair Books.
- Wisden Cricketers' Almanack, 32nd edition, editor Sydney Pardon, John Wisden & Co., 1895
- Wisden Cricketers' Almanack, 85th edition, editor Hubert Preston, Sporting Handbooks Ltd, 1948

== See also ==
- Wicket (sport) - a North American historical version of cricket
- Bat-and-ball sports
- Variations of baseball
