= Traditional games of the Dominican Republic =

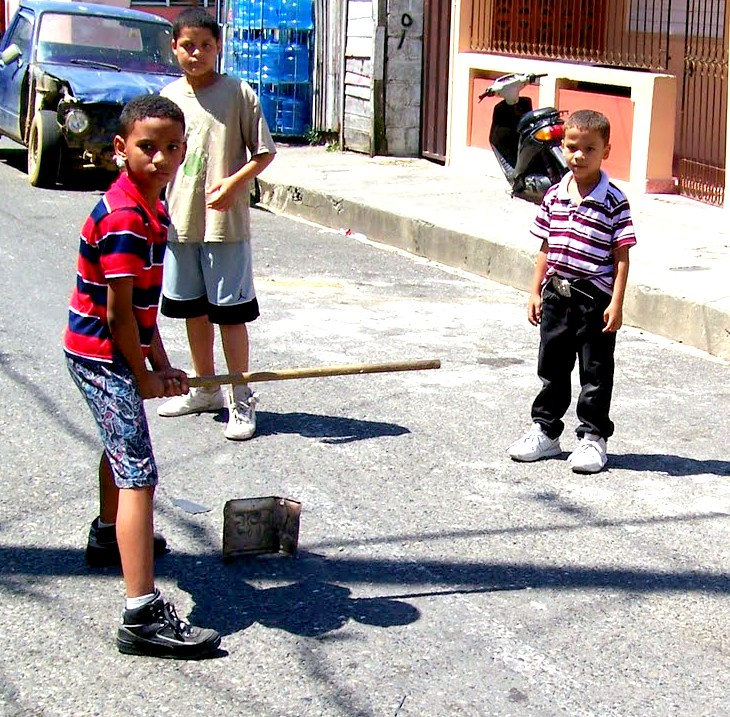
Dominican kids playing Plaquita, a baseball-like game.

The Dominican Republic has some traditional games.

== Traditional games ==
=== El juego del pañuelo ===
El juego del pañuelo is a game similar to steal the bacon.

=== Hoyito ===
Hoyito is a mancala game.

=== Plaquita ===
Plaquita is a game with similarities to street cricket.

=== Vitilla ===
Vitilla is a type of street baseball in which a plastic water bottle cap and a broomstick replace the baseball and bat respectively.
