= Traditional games of Brazil =

Brazil has many traditional games.

== Traditional games ==
=== Bete-ombro ===
Bete-ombro, also known by several other names such as taco or bets, is a form of street cricket. Two teams of two players compete, with one player throwing a ball at an opponent, who tries to hit it with a bat and then switch places with their partner in order to score.

=== Bola de gude ===
This is a game where players flick marbles at other marbles in order to capture them, with the player capturing the most marbles by the end of the game winning.

=== Cinco Marias ===
This game is a version of knucklebones.

=== Luta de galo ===
Players keep a handkerchief hanging out of their waist, and must hop on one leg while keeping the opposite arm stuck to their chest. Players lose if their raised foot touches the ground, if they allow their arm to come off their chest, or if their handkerchief is snatched by the opponent.
