= Bete-ombro =

Popular Brazilian form of street cricket

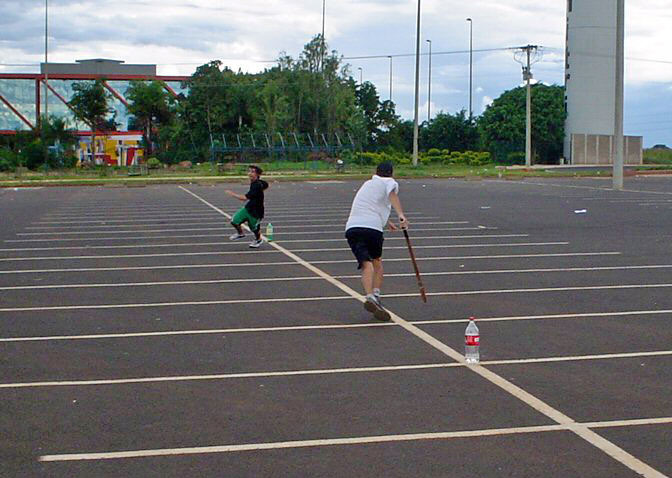
Two batters stand at opposite wickets, which are plastic bottles here.

Bete-ombro, also known as bets, tacobol, pau na lata, or taco (all of these names having a word meaning "bat" in them), is a Brazilian bat-and-ball game closely related to cricket. Two teams of two players each take turns batting and fielding. The batting team runs between two wickets, which are generally plastic bottles (or more reminiscent of cricket, three small wooden sticks propped up so that they all lean on each other), while the fielding team can run out batters by hitting a wicket with the ball before the closest batter reaches it. (As there are only two players on the batting team, teams swap as soon as a batter is out.) Bowled, stumped, and caught are other forms of dismissal.

Prince Harry played it on a trip to Brazil. Taco has been credited with helping to grow and influence women's cricket in Brazil.

There has been a "World Cup of Bets" held in Brazil, with teams from four cities, in 2016.

When introducing cricket to Brazilian audiences, Brazilian media sometimes compare it to bete-ombro. Bete-ombro may have been more popular in the 1990s than it is now.

== Rules ==
Each of the two fielding players stands behind one of the wickets (called "alvos" (targets) or "casinha" (small house) in Portuguese), and each of the batters in front of one of the wickets. Whichever fielder has the ball throws it to the batter at the opposing wicket, with the other fielder being a de facto wicketkeeper. The batter may try to hit the ball; if he misses, he must place his bat in his crease to avoid being stumped (unlike cricket, the batter's body can't be used for this purpose), which is generally a circle drawn on the ground in front of the wicket. If the batters decide to run, they must cross bats with each other every time they pass each other, with the batters scoring a point every time both of them run from their crease to the opposing crease. |url-status=live |archive-url=https://web.archive.org/web/20180911191517/http://www.educacaofisica.seed.pr.gov.br/modules/conteudo/conteudo.php?conteudo=392 |archive-date=2018-09-11}}

Similar to the bat flip in cricket, there is the "wet or dry" method of deciding which team bats first in bete-ombro: first, one side of the bat is wetted, and then the bat is thrown up in the air. The team that correctly calls whether the wet or dry side of the bat will fall face-up chooses whether to bat or bowl first. (Unlike a cricket bat, both sides of the bete-ombro bat are flat, so it wouldn't be possible to call "Hills or Flats").

There is a rule reminiscent of strikeouts in baseball: if the ball goes behind the batter 3 times, then they are out. The game ends when one team gets 12 or 25 points, though there may be additional conditions.

== In culture ==
In some parts of Brazil, the expression "largar os betes" (to drop the bats) is used to mean "to give up".

== See also ==
- Backyard cricket
- Catch (Note: children's game of catching the ball or object such as Frisbee)
- Flying disc sports
- French cricket
- Lawn game
- Plaquita — a very similar version of cricket played in the Dominican Republic
- Stickball
- Wiffleball
