= Throwing =

Action of launching an object

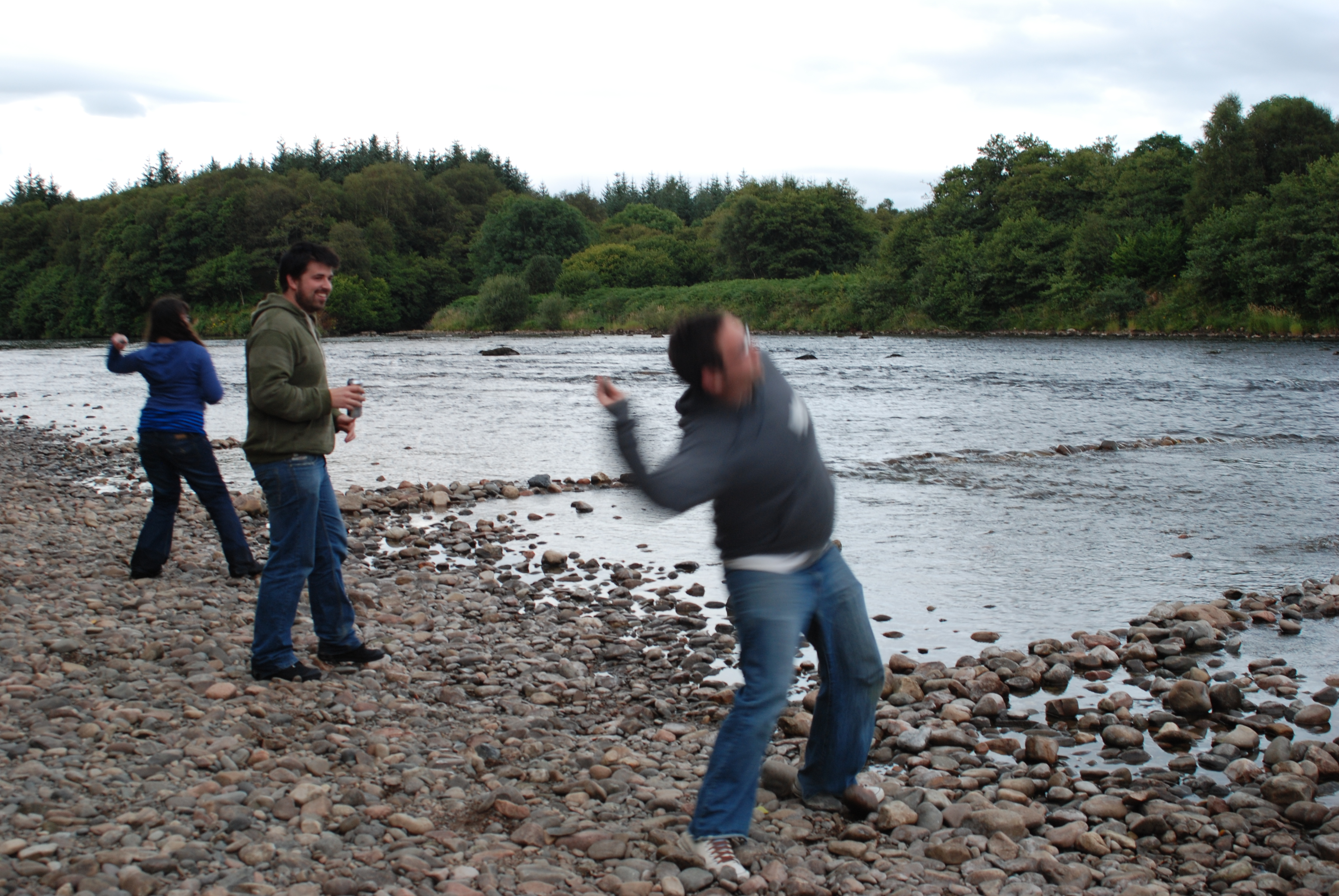
Throwing stones into a river

Throwing (/θroʊ/) is a physical action that consists of mechanically accelerating a projectile and then releasing it into a ballistic trajectory, usually with the aim of impacting a distant target. Throwing typically refers to hand-throwing by animals with prehensile forelimbs, in which the projectile is grasped in a hand and the proximal limb segments move through compounded kinematic chains to impart a mechanically advantaged swinging motion. For other animals, the definition of throwing is somewhat unclear, as other actions such as spitting or spraying may or may not be included.

Primates are the most prolific throwers in the animal kingdom, and they typically throw feces as a form of agonistic behavior. Of all primates, humans are by far the most capable throwers, able to throw a large variety of projectiles with great force and accuracy. Throughout human evolution, humans (especially Homo sapiens) have used hand-thrown projectiles for hunting and in warfare—first through rock-throwing, then refined weapon-throwing (e.g. spear, axe or dart), and into modern day with payload-carrying devices such as hand grenades, flashbangs and tear gas canisters.

To overcome the biophysical limitations of throwing by hand, humans also designed tools to improve the efficiency of their throwing techniques. The atlatl, amentum, sling and various models of catapults are notable examples of throwing mechanisms.

With the advent of the bow and arrow, and later the gunpowder-based firearm, human innovation into throwing tools as weapons essentially halted, but throwing either by hand or with tools has persisted for recreational purposes (such as thrower tools in fishing and clay pigeon shooting) or as a form of exercise. Throwing is thus still performed in many sports and games, particularly ball games. In throwing sports (especially track and field) throwing is the main determiner of the outcome.

== Evolutionary history ==
Throwing dates back two million years to Homo erectus. Development of the offensive throwing of projectiles is mostly a development of the human lineage, although the aimed throwing of sticks and rocks by male chimpanzees during agonistic displays has been observed, first described by Jane Goodall in 1964. "Accumulative throwing", that is, the targeted throwing of rocks at a specific target, leading to the gradual accumulation of a stone pile, has also been described for chimpanzees. Wooden darts were used for hunting at least from the Middle Paleolithic, by Homo heidelbergensis. The spear-thrower is a development of the Upper Paleolithic, certainly in use by the Solutrean (c. 20,000 years ago).

Human athletes can achieve throwing speeds close to 145 km/h (90 mph), far in excess of the maximal speed attainable by chimpanzees, at about 30 km/h (19 mph). This reflects the ability of the human shoulder muscles and tendons to store elasticity until it is needed to propel an object.

== Types ==
Types of throws include overhand throws, underhand throws and using both hands. Overhand throws are thrown predominantly above the shoulder, underhand throws below. Overhand throws are usually significantly faster, and ball speeds of 105 miles per hour (169 km/h) have been recorded in baseball. Thrown objects can often be intentionally spun for stability or aerodynamic effects.

The notion of throwing typically refers to an action performed without mechanical assistance, but mechanical assistance, as long as it does not involve the release of chemical or electric energy, does not fundamentally change the nature of the action, and can thus be considered as throwing too. As such, throwing mechanisms will be discussed in this section.

=== Overhand throwing motion ===
The overhand throwing motion is a complex motor skill that involves the entire body in a series of linked movements starting from the legs, progressing up through the pelvis and trunk, and culminating in a ballistic motion in the arm which propels a projectile forward. It is used almost exclusively in athletic events. The throwing motion can be broken down into three basic steps: cocking, accelerating, and releasing.

Desired qualities in the action produce a fast, accurate throw. These qualities are affected by the physical traits of the thrower like height, strength, and flexibility. However, it is mainly the throwing motion mechanics and the thrower's ability to coordinate them that determines the quality of the throw. Determining the desired qualities of the throwing motion is difficult to assess due to the extremely short amount of time that it takes professionals to perform the motion.

=== Throwing mechanisms ===
Throwing mechanisms, along with projectiles themselves, rank amongst the oldest technological artefacts in the archaeological records. They vary greatly in size and complexity, from the hand-held and extremely simple sling, to the very heavy and complex catapults. These two types of devices have in common with hand-throwing the fact that the only requirements for their projectiles are size and weight. In that sense, they differ from more specialized throwing techniques such as those developed in archery, where the projectiles have very strong requirements for their shape.

== Uses ==
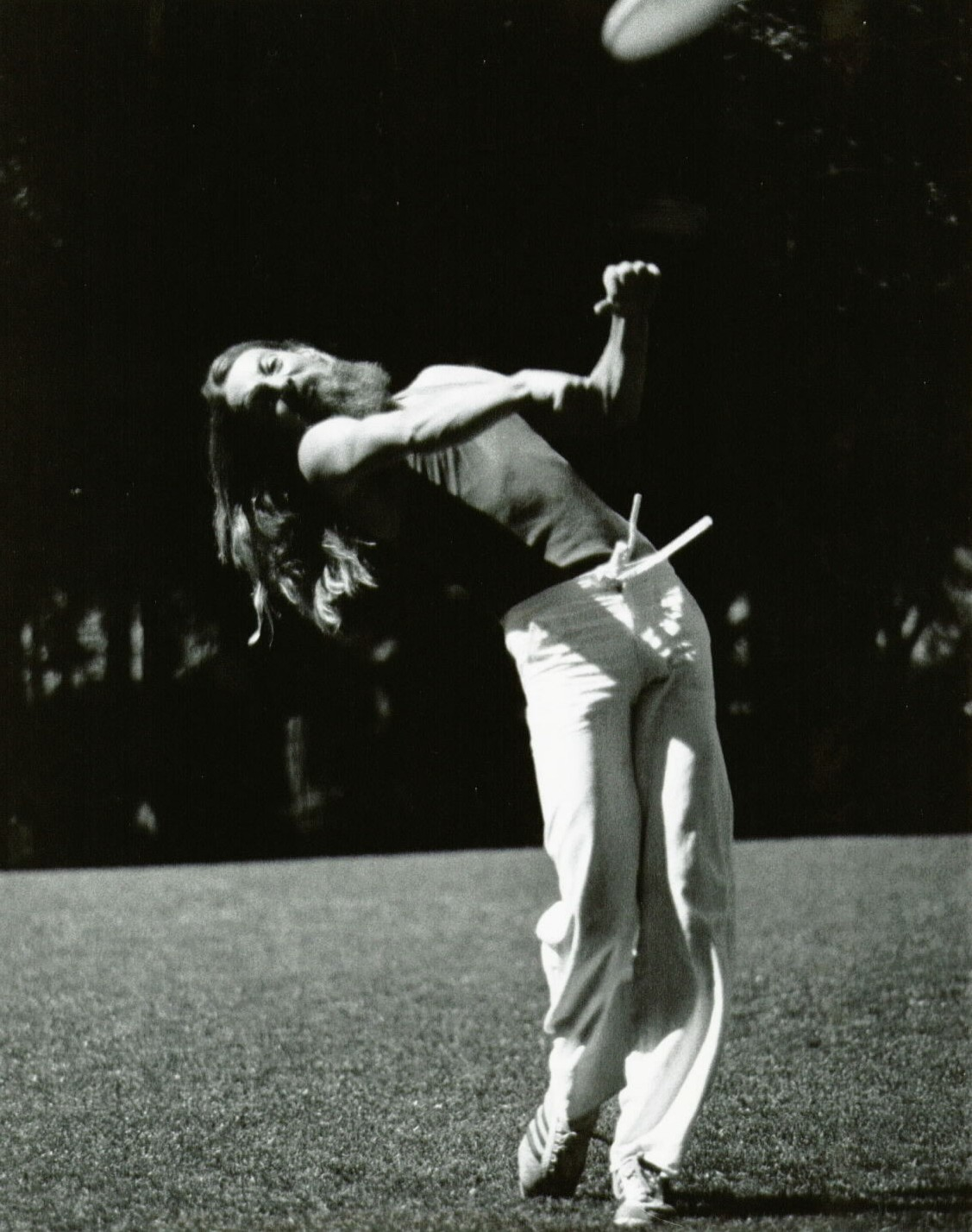
Ken Westerfield sidearm (forehand) frisbee distance throwing, 1970s.

=== Thrown weapons ===
Throwing is used for propelling weapons such as stones or spears at enemies, predators, or prey.

- Knife throwing, the art of throwing a knife at a target
- Spear throwing was used and until relatively recent times was the predominant mode of weaponry used in warfare
- Throwing axes are thrown, usually overhand
- Boomerangs (throwing sticks) are used by Aboriginals for hunting purposes
- Shurikenjutsu are traditional Japanese thrown weapons
- Hand grenades are thrown explosives

=== Sports and games ===
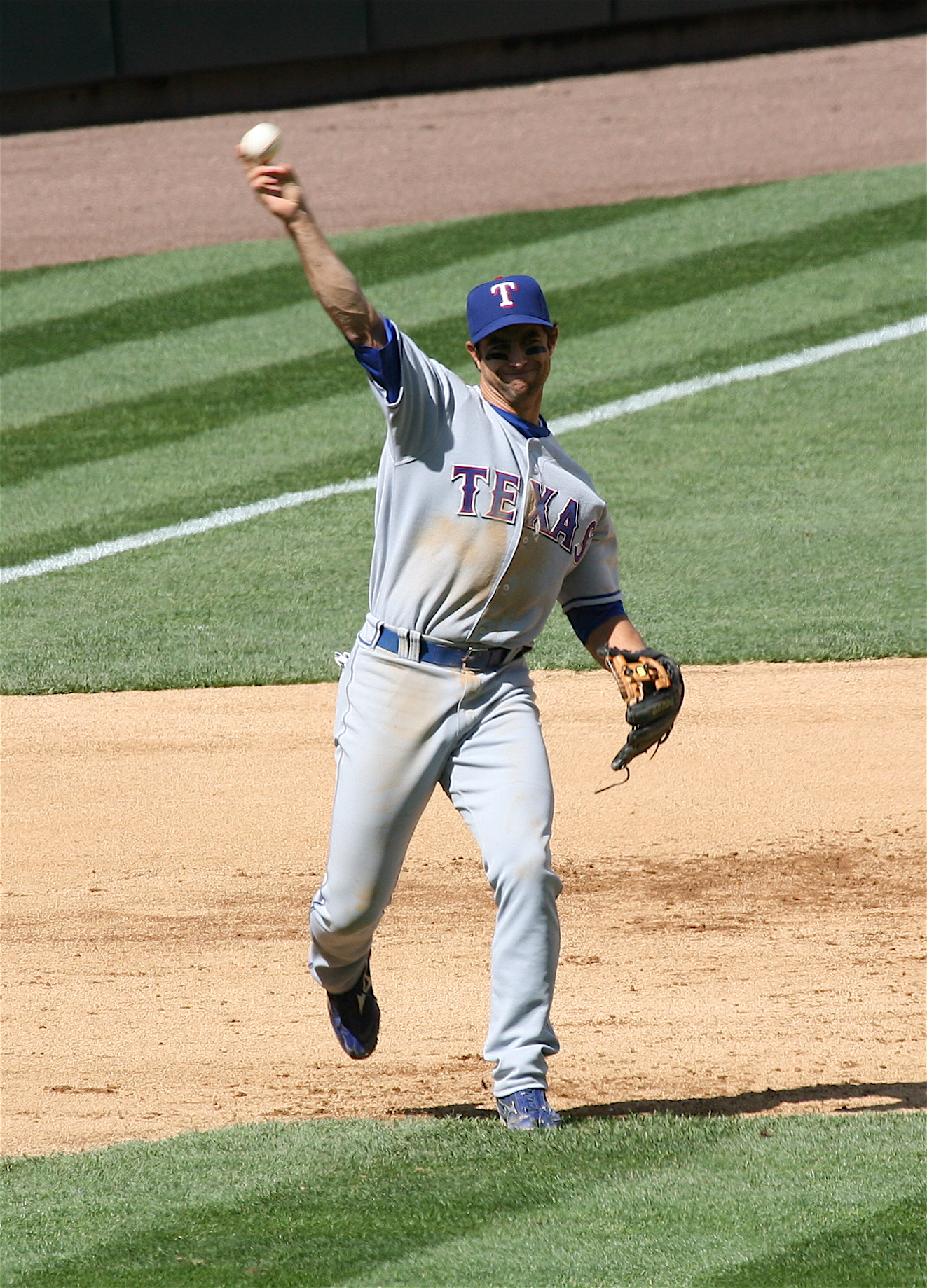
Throwing of a baseball

- Pitching or bowling in bat-and-ball games, e.g. cricket, baseball, softball
- Throwing of balls and clubs is used in juggling
- Bowling
- Darts
- Flying disc games
- Stone skipping

Track and field has four major throwing events: discus throw, hammer throw, javelin throw and shot put. The weight throw is the fifth most common field throwing event, while the club throw is unique to disability athletics.

=== Playing catch and fetch, object transport including disposal ===
Humans also throw in cooperative ways, for example when the target of a throw performs a complementary action, to catch. Humans are perhaps the only animal capable of throwing with such an intent. Humans play catch with each other, and fetch with dogs (dogs catch, but do not throw). Related behaviors have yielded phrases such as to (e.g. throw a bone to someone, or throwing someone or something to the dogs.

A purpose of throwing can be to transport an object from oneself, to someone or somewhere else, without having to move from one's spot. People building something together, for example, may throw small enough objects to each other. A specific, common variant of this is when the intent is to dispose of something, where someone may speak of throwing something away, even when nothing is being thrown.

== Difference between sexes ==
Boys throw faster, further and more accurately than girls. Some research suggests there exist innate biological differences between the sexes that lead to disparities in throwing efficiency, with males better adapted at delivering more effective throws than females.

== Non-primates ==
Throwing is rare among non-primates, but provided the definition is relaxed to entail for instance spitting, several examples can be found amongst various taxa, such as camelids, cobras or the archerfish.

Elephants have been observed throwing rocks and logs, using their trunk to grab and flick items, although they lack the accuracy that primates can achieve, and it is more commonly used as a warning to aggressors.

If one is willing to consider dropping as a special case of throwing, then one can include birds, most notably vultures, because some species are known to drop stones in order to break shells or other hard food sources on the ground.

Orcas are often observed throwing seals in the air, usually by hitting them with their caudal fin. This behavior is speculated to be purely recreational.

== See also ==
- Catch (game)
