= Half-rubber =

Bat-and-ball game

Half-rubber, also known as halfball or halfies, is a bat-and-ball game similar to stick ball or baseball. The game was developed in the American South around the beginning of the 20th century, moving north with the Great Migration in New York City and Philadelphia where it was widely played by the 1950s in addition to stick ball. It can be played with as few as three players and involves no running of bases.

The sport was typically played on a city street, now played in parks or the beach, using a baseball-sized rubber ball, that has been cut or sawed in half. Legendary origins of this "half-ball"' vary: from kids splitting a ball so that two games could be played at once; to an accident where a pimpleball broke in half and kids had no money to buy a new one so they played with a half-ball; to an innovation by adults who wanted to reduce the chances of the ball breaking windows on nearby buildings.

== History ==
The cities of Savannah, Georgia and Charleston, South Carolina both claim to be the birthplace of half-rubber as early as the 1890s. In his book Halfrubber: The Savannah Game, Dan Jones interviewed players who dated the game as far back as 1913. In the August 1927 edition of American Speech Journal, English teacher Lowry Axley claims that the game originated in Savannah "some eight to ten years ago by two boys who got the idea when they were hitting pop-bottle caps with broom handles." In the January 1975 issue of Western Folklore, Hugh M. Thomoson says that he played half-rubber in rural Georgia in the mid-1930s.

In South Carolina, half-rubber traces its roots back to the Charleston neighborhood of Little Mexico. Other accounts record the game as coming from the freed slave community of Pin Point, Georgia. Half-rubber was played by African-Americans in the streets in and around both Savannah, and Charleston during the Great Depression. Some young half-rubber players went on to play professional baseball for the Negro leagues during segregation, claiming that they got to be good hitters because it was easy to hit a whole baseball with a thick bat after years of swinging at a half-ball with a skinny broomstick.

Over several generations, half-rubber's popularity waxed and waned in South Carolina and Georgia, with resurgences occurring the 1940s and 1970s. Meanwhile, the game known as halfball was being played in cities around the northeastern United States in the 1930s, 1940s, and 1950s and remained popular throughout the 1960s and 1970s, particularly in Philadelphia, Camden, Boston and New York City, as far west as St. Louis, as well as on the beaches of Cape Cod. Halfball or half-rubber games and tournaments can now be found in other cities around the U.S. under either name. Which name gets used often indicates if it was brought there from the north or the south.

Beginning in the 1970s, Thomas Cosmo Harper brought the game of halfball to the US West Coast of Turtle Island in Los Angeles, CA as well as Seattle and Spokane, WA. Coinciding with the outbreak of the COVID-19 pandemic in the spring of 2020, Mr. Harper officially established the World Halfball League (WHBL) to meet the global need for a new sport with built-in social distancing measures. Through collaboration with the Academy for Gameful & Immersive Learning Experiences, WHBL is attempting to create a new form for the sport that uses Augmented reality, Mixed reality, and Virtual reality technologies that can be played and watched from quarantine.

== Rules ==
The basic premise of the game is a pitcher throws a half-ball toward a batter who swings at it with a stick or bat, and a catcher who tries to catch the half-ball. Some players like to wear gloves, some do not. From there, rules vary greatly from state to state, city to city, and even block to block. On November 11, 2020, the World Halfball League (WHBL) published a text titled "Rules for the Sport of Halfball" with the goal of ultimately making the game accessible in many languages everywhere. While there are differences between the rulebook published by WHBL and some variations below, all players agree that half a ball is twice the fun. According to page two of "Rules for the Sport of Halfball", players wishing to enter their games and stats into the WHBL and its related leagues must play by the rules in the most current version of the rule book and thus should only consult the rules specified there.

=== Equipment ===
The equipment for the sport consists of a broomstick or mop handle used as a bat, and a solid rubber ball cut in half, though in urban halfball games a bisected pimple ball or tennis ball is often used. Half-rubber regulations call for a stick 48" long, while some halfball experts state 41" long and 1¼" thick as a standard. The World Halfball League book titled "Rules for the Sport of Halfball", on the other hand, states no wider than 1" diameter wooden dowel or broomstick of any length. In Boston a bladeless hockey stick is often used for a halfball bat, and special bats and pre-cut balls 2½–3" in diameter are also manufactured for the sport.

=== Players ===
When three play, each plays for themselves rotating duties as pitcher, catcher and batter. With four players, two-person teams take turns batting and fielding. The two players act as pitcher and catcher while fielding, and alternate as batters when not. Tournaments usually use three-player teams, and four-player teams are common in the south where half-rubber is played in parks and on beaches, with extra players taking the field.

=== Play ===
Play consists of the pitcher throwing the ball to the catcher, while a batter attempts to hit the ball, as in baseball. Some half-rubber regulations call for the pitcher to stand 50 or 60 feet from the batter whereas the WHBL states that "Distance from Home Plate to Pitching Rubber = 13 Strides" and also provides dimensions for distance fields which can be played "down the street" or at any park, parking lot, or indoor gymnasium with sufficient space and for wall fields which can be played on any suitable wall of 3 or more stories in height.

Pitchers try to strike out batters; one strike is an out if the missed halfball is caught by the catcher. If the catcher misses the pitch, the batter is not out and gets another chance. If the batter tips the ball and the catcher catches it, the batter is out, and in Savannah and South Carolina this counts for "double outs, your out plus the next hitter."

No baserunning is involved in the game—the score is kept by keeping track of imaginary runners tagging the bases of a non-existent diamond. Typically, a grounder past the pitcher is a single; if the pitcher fields it before it gets past position, it is an out (not in Savannah). Fly balls past the pitcher—unless caught for outs—are doubles, and balls hit to a pre-designated distance are home runs. Triples are agreed upon prior to games. Tournament half-rubber has only singles and home runs, the latter being achieved by hitting the ball 120 feet, or double the distance between batter and pitcher.

In three-player games, a batter continues to swing until out, signaling the rotation of players from batter to catcher to pitcher. In team play, each inning the next player in the batting order hits first when their side is up to bat. Game length varies regionally: three innings in South Carolina, four to nine in Georgia, seven in New Jersey, etc. Some play that a tie results in an extra inning with an "all hits are runs" rule.

=== Strategy ===
- Pitching, catching and hitting, in that order, are the most important skills. Good pitchers can make the ball sail—upshoot, left-curve, right-curve, drop balls, etc.—in countless directions, and some pitchers get to be extremely good. Batters, meanwhile, attempt to make contact. Playing with a backstop is a good idea.
- It takes a long time to become a good pitcher, only slightly less for a catcher. Hitting is not easy either, but is the easiest of the three skills to learn.
- If the batter tips the ball and the catcher catches it then the next batter on that team is out in addition to the batter.
- The game goes faster if you have someone to retrieve the batted balls. Also, having several balls is a plus.
- Playing on grass or sand leads to less ball bounce than playing on concrete.
- Though seldom used, some players have a 'home' rule that says four consecutive pitches that the batter does not swing at and the catcher does not catch is the same as a hit for the batter. That rule makes the pitcher attempt to throw pitches that the hitter can reach.

== Variations ==
Similar street games using improvised stand-ins for a ball have existed in different cities under various names. One called "tire ball" was played in Philadelphia with a 4-inch piece of balloon bicycle tire or garden hose. Because the tire was harder than a half-ball and more liable to break windows, the game was usually played lengthwise in a driveway rather than across a street.
