= Test Match (board game) =

Board games

Test Match refers to two cricket-themed board games. Both are distinct from table-top football game Subbuteo's cricket variation.

== John Waddington version ==
Cover of the 1955 John Sands edition

The first version was first published in 1955 by John Waddington Limited in the United Kingdom and John Sands Pty. Ltd. in Australia.

Russell Jackson notes that "you pulled on a couple of cardboard tabs to randomly generate a type of delivery before your batting opponent did the same on the other end of the board, but if you were a genuinely competitive player, the reliance on luck over skill would eventually start to grate."

The original game depends entirely by chance, and is similar in principle to pencil cricket.

== Crown and Andrews version ==
A three-dimensional version was released by Crown and Andrews in the 1977. It was originally made by Peter Pan. The figurines came unpainted allowing for the caps or shirts to be painted in the player's favourite colours. The game involves one player rolling a ball-bearing down a plastic chute attached to a plastic bowler, while another player operates the batter. Fielders catch the ball by stopping it between their feet. According to Jackson, this is "the greatest cricket board game of all time."

In 2010 Crown and Andrews introduced Test Match Ashes Edition with rules for limited overs and Twenty20 variations. New features included: over arm bowling with controllable speed; a bouncing ball; the batsman used a trigger action; and the fielders included magnets to attract the magnetised ball. The recommended retail price was A$59.99 (equivalent to $79.47 in 2022).

Test Match is Crown and Andrews' most popular game, despite producing various sports games.
