= French cricket =

Informal game

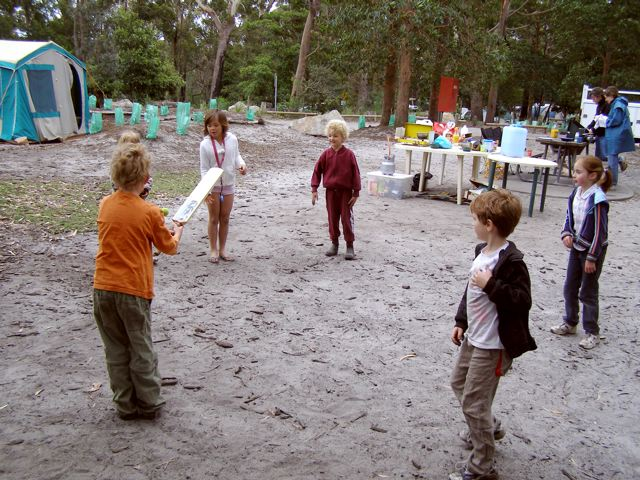
French cricket. Note upward scooping of bat and legs held close together by batter. Game being played at Jervis Bay, Australia, a popular holiday location.

French cricket is a form of cricket that creates a game similar to catch. The game can be played socially at picnics and parties or on parks and beaches. It is a form of cricket that can include children of varied ages.

Not all participants need to be fully involved, and spectators can make a catch and have a bat (informally). In India children often play this game with a plastic or rubber ball, it is called as "Bat-Ball" or "Catch-Catch", and in some parts of Australia the game is referred to as "toey", derived from the word 'toe' (as feet are a target for dismissal, see below).

== Game play ==
There is only one batter, and their objective is to not be dismissed by the other participants — who are fielders, or a bowler if they have possession of the ball — for as long as possible. The objective of the other participants is to dismiss the batter. There are only two methods of dismissal, being caught or being "Leg Before Wicket", but as there are no stumps, this method of dismissal is effected by a bowled ball hitting the batter's legs typically below the knees. (Note: In India, in this type of cricket, batter can be out only by catching the ball by fielders and bowler.) Once the batter is dismissed, the other participant who took the catch or effected the LBW typically replaces them as batter, and the game-play begins again. There are many varieties of additional rules. The batter may be obliged to stay with their legs in the same place, facing the same way for the whole of their innings; they may remain in the same place but be permitted to change their stance if they effect a shot by hitting the ball; or, they may be able to freely move around after playing a shot. The batter may also score runs in some variations of the game.

== Rules ==
The batsman stands stationary with the bat protecting their legs, their legs being the "stumps" of formal cricket. Whichever other player has the ball throws it at the batsman attempting to dismiss them by hitting their legs. If the batsman hits the ball, the other participants may also dismiss the batter by a catch.

=== Players ===
French cricket is most commonly played by children, or mixed groups of children and adults. Adults sometimes play the game as an event diversion during outdoor parties or on picnics. If the game is played more seriously, players take turns to bat and the player who batted for the most balls or the longest time is considered the winner.

=== Equipment ===
The type of equipment is not restricted to cricket equipment, but there are only two items used. The ball is typically a tennis ball, bowled underarm at the legs of another player holding a cricket bat, a tennis racquet, or some other object that can be used as like a cricket bat.

Albert Camus, in his book The First Man, describes (page 34) the game of Canette Vinga played with a cigar shaped bit of wood rather than a ball. The batter stands in a circle and the bowler has to get the pointed piece of wood to land in the circle, whilst the batter tries to hit it far away. Camus calls the game "Poor man's tennis" (page 35) but it is much nearer to French Cricket.

=== Batting ===
The player holding the bat, the batsman, is required to block and defend their "wicket", with the batsman's legs taking the place of the stumps. The batsman is not allowed to move their legs, and in some variants, the batsman can only hit the ball in a direct upward or scooping-like motion.

=== Fielding ===
Any number of fielders can stand around the batsman, and any fielder can bowl at the batsman from any angle.

When played in India, normally players can stand front, left and right side but can not stand behind the batsman and bowler must bowl with a full toss to batsman and they should hit ball in the air but they should not hit the ball far from the fielders’ reach.

=== Rule varieties ===
==== Batting ====
- Often, the batsman is only allowed to turn to face the next delivery if they hit the ball. If they miss and are not dismissed, they must attempt to play the next ball (which is bowled from where the ball ended up after the previous delivery) without being allowed to turn to face it. Sometimes additionally, if the batsman does not turn to face the ball before a fielder picks it up, they would have to turn their waist and face the fielder bowling in order to hit the ball.
- In some variations, the batsman is not allowed to turn at all, and is declared out if their feet move. Restrictive rules like this also help to contain the ball in smaller areas such as backyards.
- In other variations, if the batsman has effected a shot, they can relocate as fast as they can run, until a fielder has the ball in their hands.
- In other variations, a batsman can score runs. Alternatively, when the batsman hits the ball, they can make 'runs' by revolving the bat around themselves with both hands. A batsman can take these runs until the ball is in the hands of a fielder and they call 'ready'.
- In other variations, a batsman cannot be out first ball. A batsman scores 'runs' each time a ball is bowled at them or passed between fielders. And, if they should hit a rather lengthy shot, for a bonus of 10 'runs' they can offer the bowler a free bowl without being allowed to defend it.

==== Fielding ====
- In one variation, once the fielder has fielded the ball they cannot take any steps until they have bowled the ball or passed the ball to another fielder. Passes to fielders can be thrown overarm or sidearm but to get a batter out with a direct throw the fielder must throw the ball underarm.
- Sometimes the batsman can be caught out "one-hand one-bounce". When this rule is applied, the batsman will also be dismissed if the catcher takes the ball with one hand after it has bounced only once.

== Origin of the name ==
Suggested possibilities include juxtaposition with the English origin of regular cricket. It seems likely that as the game is a lesser version of regular cricket that the name is intended to mock both the game and the French — just as a "French cut" in the sport of cricket is a poorly executed cut shot which almost gets a batsman out. The name may also have arisen from the similarity of the batting motion to the one used in croquet which while not a French game is sometimes assumed to be French because of its name.

== See also ==
- Cricket terminology
- Backyard cricket – Another form of cricket for children.
