= Fuzzball (sport) =

Bat and ball game

Fuzzball is a bat-and-ball street game related to baseball, usually formed as a pick-up game, and played in various areas of the United States (especially St. Louis, but also in Chicago where it is called "strikeout", Florida, and South Carolina). The equipment consists of a bat and a tennis ball that has had its outer layer burned or worn off. The rules come from baseball and are modified to fit the situation, i.e. whether it is played indoors or outside. Fuzzball can be played by as few as two players; outside of leagues in St. Louis, the Bevo Area Fuzzball League and the St. Louis Metro Fuzzball League and the annual Kearns Park Fuzzball Tournament of Champions, it exists as a pickup game, which has been successfully transplanted to "players leagues" which play a quasi-legal, quasi-outlaw version in Philadelphia and Northern California (San Jose and Santa Cruz, specifically). There are also fully official organized leagues for indoor fuzzball in St. Louis. Interest in the game was waning, however, at the turn of the century: by 2004, most serious players were in their 40s, with a decreasing number of new players becoming interested. Many St. Louis locals consider fuzzball to be a minor league training ground for future corkball players.

== History ==
Fuzzball developed from the forms of bottlecaps and corkball that were played in St. Louis in the 1920s and 1930s. Fuzzball Nation has hosted a tournament in South St. Louis City since 1982 every Labor Day weekend. John Enger serves as the commissioner.

== Game play ==
Fuzzball rules follow the same general rule structure as baseball, with the finer details varying considerably by region. The one consistent difference between fuzzball and baseball is the use of a tennis ball instead of a baseball. Players may or may not use a baseball glove while fielding.

Indoor fuzzball is usually played inside of a large net with no base runners. Outdoor fuzzball can be played either on paved school playgrounds (typically marked off for kickball) or on a baseball or softball field. Serious players will also use a cigarette lighter or a blowtorch to burn the felt off of the ball, thereby making it much faster when pitched. Bats may consist of broom handles, baseball bats, corkball bats, or official fuzzball bats, such as those made by Markwort Sporting Goods of St. Louis, Missouri. Markwort also makes an official fuzzball for use in games.

The batter may be out after one, two or three strikes. The batter may also walk after three, four, or five balls. If a batter is hit by a pitch, it can be worth two balls or the strike count may be reset. Once again, this depends on regional rules. If the ball lands behind a fence, on a roof, on a porch, or breaks a window far away it is usually ruled a home run. In some versions of fuzzball where space is a concern, hits are decided by how far the ball travels, in which case there is no running (similar to corkball).

If small teams play, "ghost runners" can take the place of an on-base player who must go back to home plate to bat once more. Ghost runners move the same number of bases as the batter gets on a hit. For example, if a "ghost runner" is on second base and the batter hits a double, the ghost runner passes home plate and scores a run.

Game length (including innings and outs-per-inning) also varies considerably from region to region.
