= Vitilla =

Variation of stickball played in the Dominican Republic

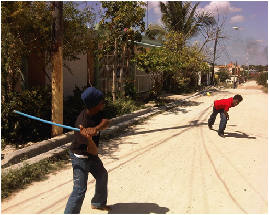
Children playing vitilla, 2011

Vitilla (Spanish pronunciation: [βiˈtiʝa]) is a popular variation of stickball played primarily in the Dominican Republic and areas in the United States with large Dominican populations.

== Overview ==
Overall rules and baserunning is roughly similar to basic forms of baseball, but there are only two bases in addition to home plate, only two or three fielders, a broomstick is used as a bat and a large plastic water bottle cap, called la vitilla, is used instead of a ball. The game also has aspects of Cricket, in that there are no walks or looking strike counts and strikeouts can be made by hitting a target behind the batter. The vitilla disk is difficult to hit, since it can float like a disk and can spin wildly at very high velocity, making for unpredictable fielding. The skill and coordination required in vitilla is credited with giving Dominican Major League Baseball players an advantage in hitting and fielding. The game evolved from Dominican stickball in the 1970s, and had its first formal tournament in 2009.

== General rules ==
External image
- Clasico de Vitilla - Red Bull

As a young street sport, there are no formal rules or governing sports authority to set rules. Beteyah, a company that makes vitilla equipment has suggested rules, and another sources of rules derives from the Red Bull Clasico De Vitilla tournaments, and the LIDOVI. Terminology is generally in Spanish, the primary language of most players.

Here is a list of ways vitilla differs from ordinary baseball:

- Field configuration Vitilla has a home plate and two bases, primera (first base) and tercera (third base); there is no second base. The base path is a triangle, 50 feet on a side. The pitcher's mark is 45 feet from home plate, centered in the field. There is no mound. There is a circular strike target behind home plate, about 18 inches diameter, about 18 inches above ground. The 15 feet in front of home plate is a foul area, in addition to the standard foul lines connecting home plate with primera and tercera. There is a home run line, perhaps 100 feet from home plate.
- General Play The team with the most runs at the end of the game wins. The number of innings is agreed upon before the game begins, as is the number of fielders. Scoring and innings are similar to baseball: each team gets to bat once an inning, and three outs ends a team's turn at bat. A player scores when they advance around all bases and return to home plate.
- Batting The lanzador (pitcher) throws the vitilla towards the strike target, the bateador (batter) stands in front of, but does not block, the target, and attempts to hit the vitilla. A strike is called if the vitilla hits the strike target, or the bateador swings and misses the vitilla, or the vitilla is hit foul with less than two strikes. There are no walks; hit-by-pitches count as strikes if the bateador blocks the target, and pitches that are not swung at or miss the strike target can be re-thrown. Hits and base running are similar to baseball, but there is no base leading or stealing.
- Fielding Fielders include the lanzador and two or three jardineros (fielders). There is no catcher; the lanzador typically keeps a large supply of vitillas nearby. Gloves are not typically worn. The lanzador must keep a foot on the pitcher's mark, it is legal to skip or bounce pitches to the bateador. As in baseball, field outs are made by catching a hit ball before it hits the ground, or by tagging a runner with vitilla in hand, or by tagging a base and forcing an out.

== See also ==
- Stickball
- Plaquita, another popular Dominican bat-and-ball game
- Backyard cricket
