= Stickball =

Street game

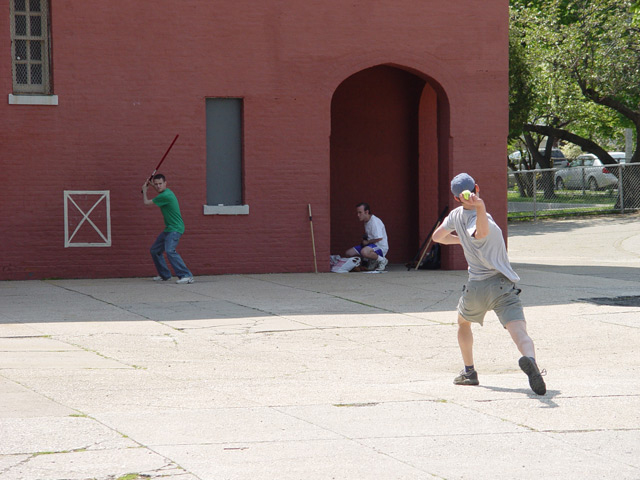
Stickball in New York

Stickball is a street game similar to baseball, usually formed as a pick-up game played in large cities in the Northeastern United States, especially New York City, Philadelphia, and Boston. The equipment consists of a broom handle or tree branch, and a rubber ball, typically a spaldeen, pensy pinky, high bouncer or tennis ball. The rules come from baseball and are modified to fit the situation. For example, a manhole cover may be used as a base, or buildings for foul lines. The game is a variation of bat and ball games dating back to at least the 1750s. This game was widely popular among youths during the 20th century until the 1980s.

== Variants ==
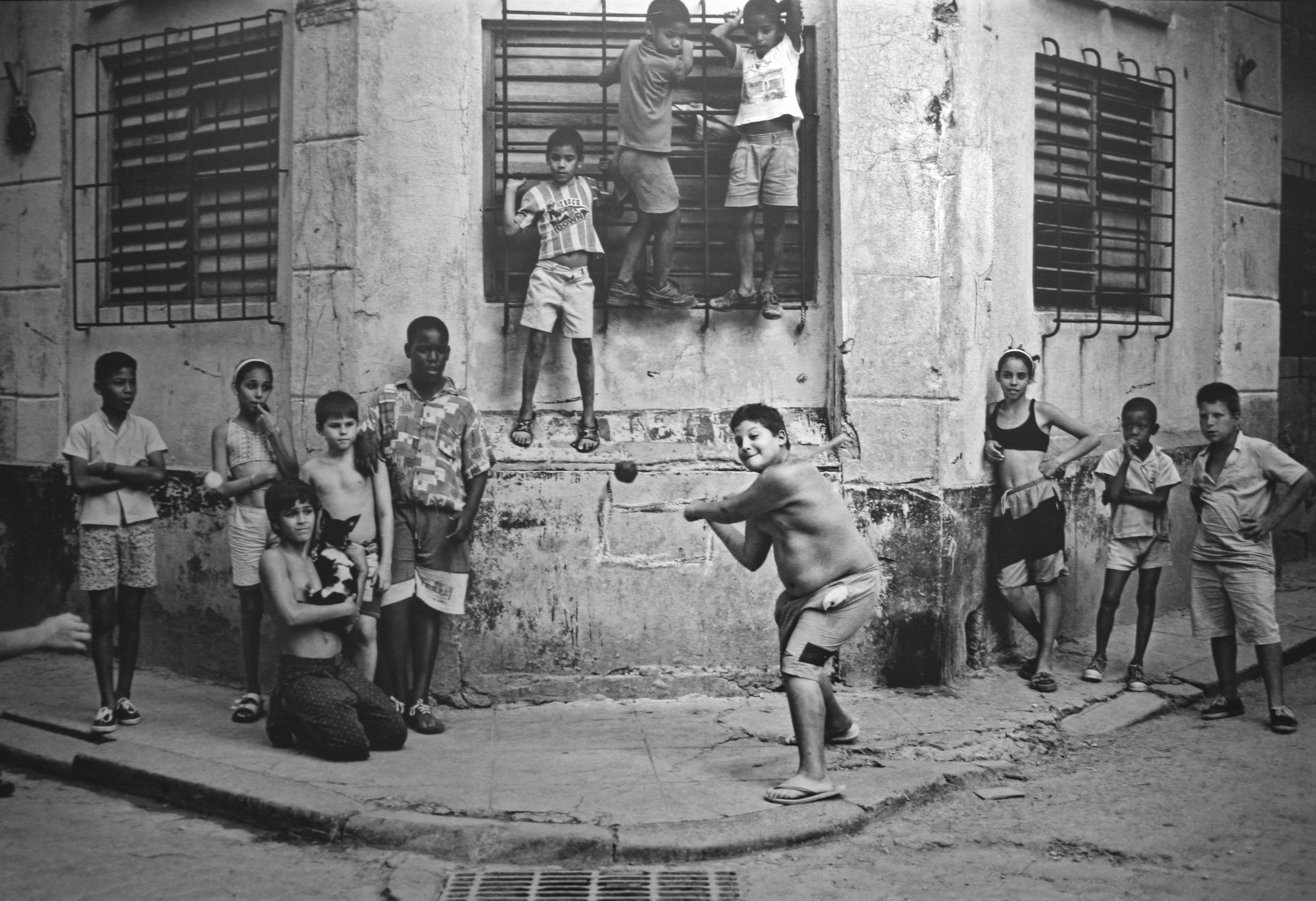
Kids playing stickball in Havana, 1999

In fungo, the batter tosses the ball into the air and hits it on the way down or after one or more bounces. Another variant is vitilla, a popular variation of stickball played primarily in the Dominican Republic and areas in the United States with large Dominican populations.

== In popular culture ==
- In a scene from the 1976 film Rocky, a group of youths play halfball (a variant of stickball) on the streets of Philadelphia. In the 1979 sequel Rocky II, the main character himself plays stickball/halfball in one scene.
- The season 4 episode, "Lisa's First Word", of the animated series The Simpsons has a scene taking place on the Lower East Side of Springfield (visualized like a typical 1930s urban New York City neighborhood) where a boy asks his friends if they want to play stickball and they agree; instead of actually playing stickball, the group of kids head over to an arcade and play a video game of the sport.
- In the song "I'm The Man" by Anthrax, Scott Ian is said to like playing stickball.
- White Collar TV series (Episode 2.02 - "Need To Know") protagonist Neal Caffrey comes up with a clever plan to create a park in honor of the fictional boy Timmy Nolan, who loved to play stickball.
- In Billions TV series (Episode 2.09 - "Sic Transit Imperium"), character Bobby Axelrod plays stickball and shares a related story of how he grew up playing stickball.
- Billy Joel's song "Keeping the Faith" mentions the lyrics, "Learned stickball as a formal education".

== See also ==
- Cork ball
- Gillidanda
- Half-rubber
- Vitilla
- Street cricket
- Street Sports Basketball
- Street Sports Baseball
