= Corkball =

Bat-and-ball game

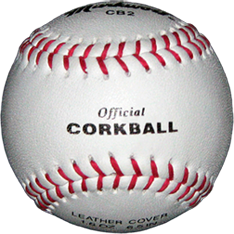
Official Corkball

Corkball is a "mini-baseball" game featuring a 1.6-ounce (45 g) ball, which is stitched and resembles a miniature baseball. The bat has a barrel that measures 1.5 inches (3.8 cm) in diameter. Originally played on the streets and alleys of St. Louis, Missouri, as early as 1890, today the game has leagues formed around the country as a result of St. Louis servicemen introducing the game to their buddies and comrades during World War II and the Korean War. It has many of the features of baseball, yet can be played in a very small area because there is no base-running.

== Game play ==
Corkball uses a 1.6-ounce (45 g) ball, which is stitched and resembles a baseball, but is only approximately 30% the mass of a regular baseball. The bat has a barrel that measures up to 1.5 inches (3.8 cm) in diameter and a maximum of 38 inches (97 cm) in length. Playing fields are traditionally 30 feet (9.1 m) in width and 250 feet (76 m) in length. Different measurements are paced off to determine hits. A batter must hit the ball at least 15 feet (4.6 m) in order to register a hit. Any hit between 15 feet (4.6 m) and 150 feet (46 m) is a single, up to 200 feet (61 m) is a double, up to 250 feet (76 m) is a triple and beyond 250 feet (76 m) is a home run. Measurements can be modified based on available conditions. Baserunning is non existent due to the measured hits. Teams have a minimum of two players (pitcher and catcher) and a maximum of five players on the field at a time. Fielders may wear baseball gloves but are not required to. The catcher must wear a catcher's mask while behind the plate. Pitching rubber and home plate are the same as used in baseball. "Runners" advance as many bases as the batter gets on the hit. If a runner is on first and the batter hits a double, then the resulting runners will be on second and third. If a runner is on first and the batter hits a single, then it will be first and second.

== See also ==
- Bat-and-ball games
- Stickball
- Fuzzball
- Wiffleball
