= Fetch (game) =

Pet sport

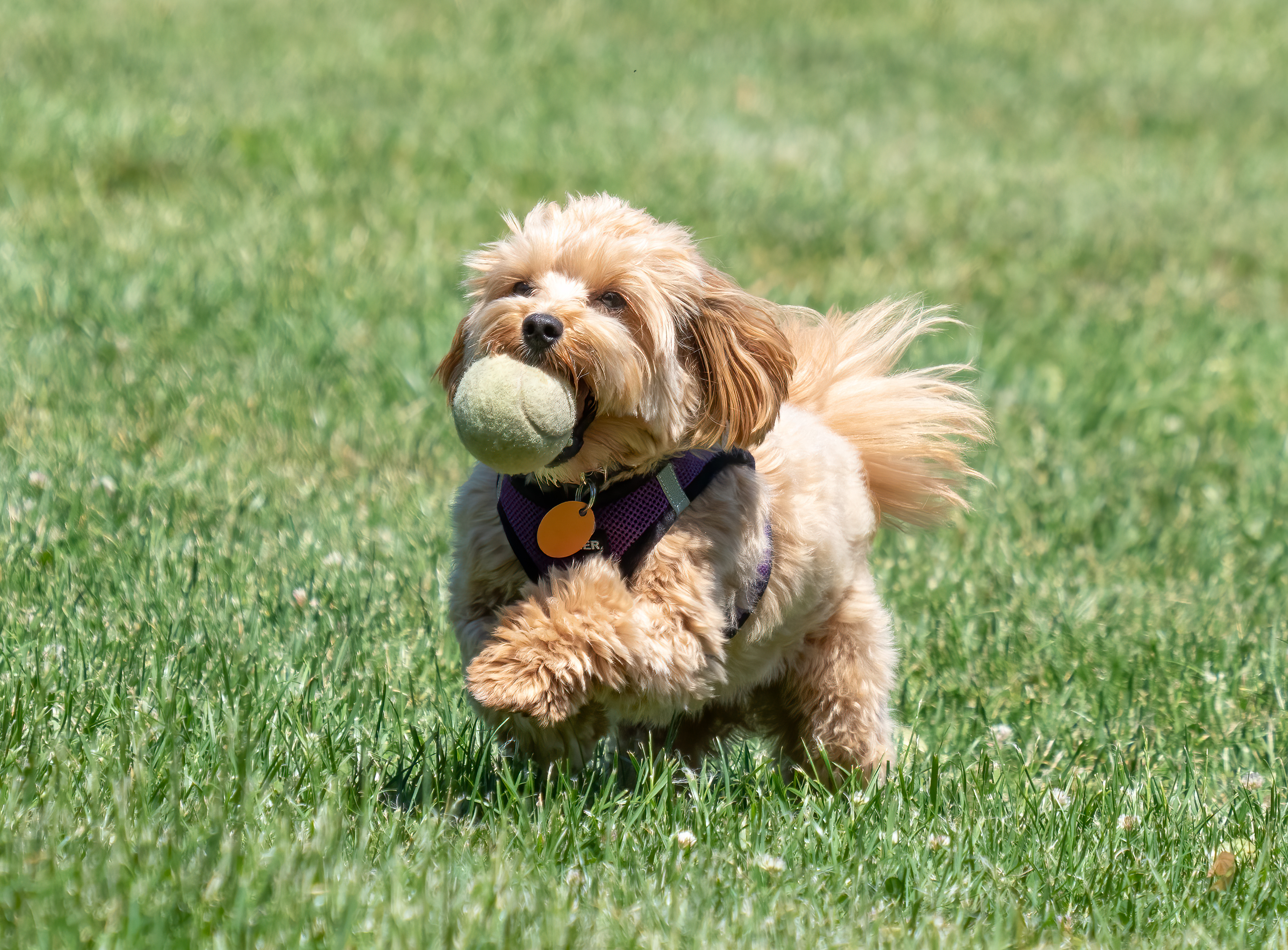
A dog returning a thrown ball

Fetch is a pet game where an object, such as a stick or ball, is thrown a moderate distance away from the animal, and it is the animal's objective to grab and retrieve ("fetch") it. Many times, the owner of the animal will say "Fetch" to the animal before or after throwing the object. The game is usually played with a dog, but, in rare instances, cats (especially kittens) have been known to engage in fetch behavior.

Playing fetch with a dog at a beach in Japan

== Mathematics of fetch ==
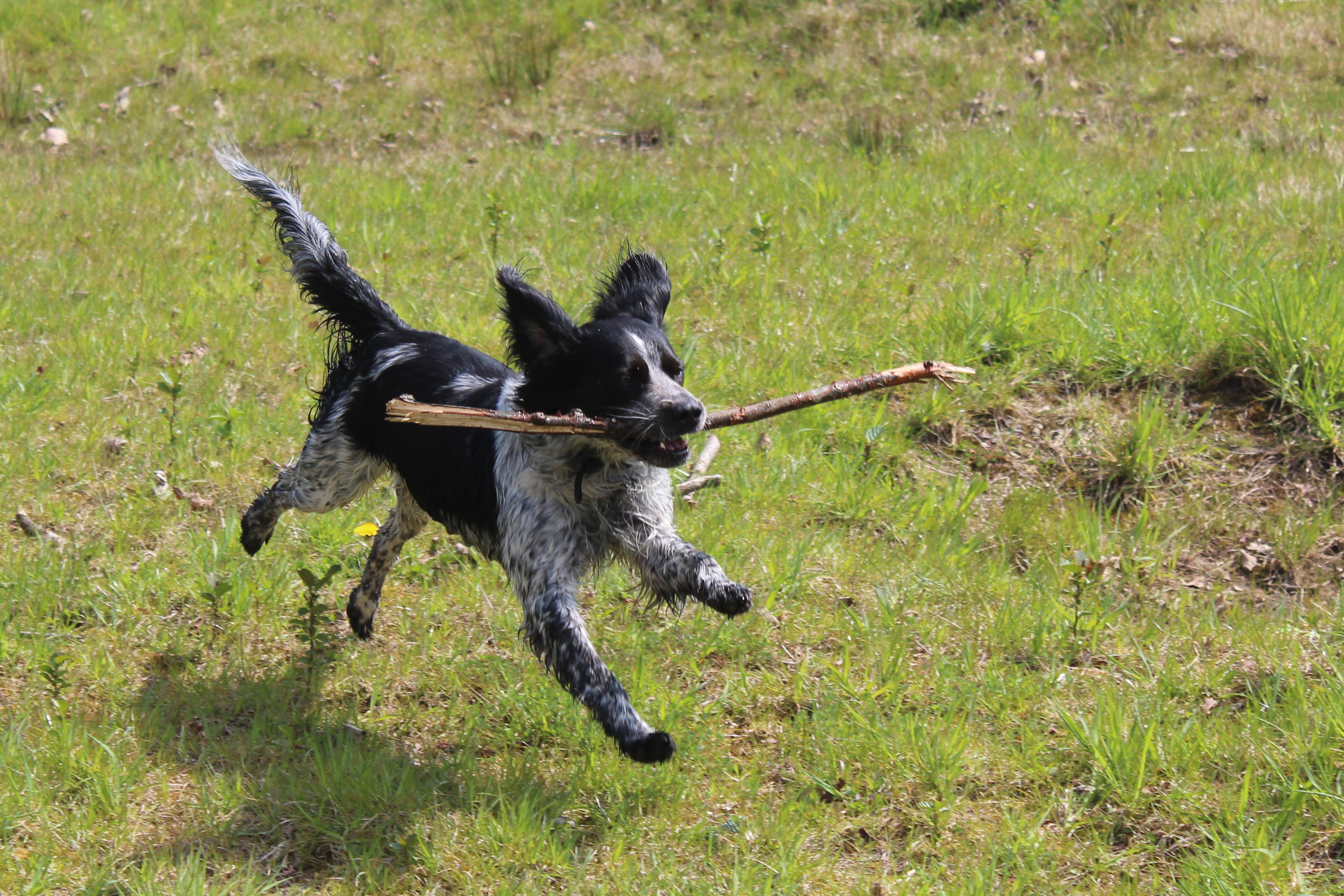
A Spaniel fetches a stick

Arizona State psychology professor Michael McBeath has proposed a simple model to explain how dogs play fetch. By mounting a camera on the head of a dog, he found that the dog changed its speed and direction in order to keep the frisbee's image in a constant position on its retina. This approach, called the linear optical trajectory, makes the frisbee appear to move in a linear path at a constant speed. McBeath had previously noticed this interception strategy in professional baseball players pursuing fly balls.

Tim Pennings, a mathematics professor at Hope College, has found that dogs are somehow able to calculate the optimal path to a ball thrown in the water. While playing Fetch with his Welsh Corgi, he noticed that the dog ran along the beach for a certain distance before jumping into the water. Because the dog is faster on land, this technique minimizes the total retrieval time. He showed that the dog is able to calculate the optimal point to jump into the water, a problem Pennings must resort to calculus to solve.

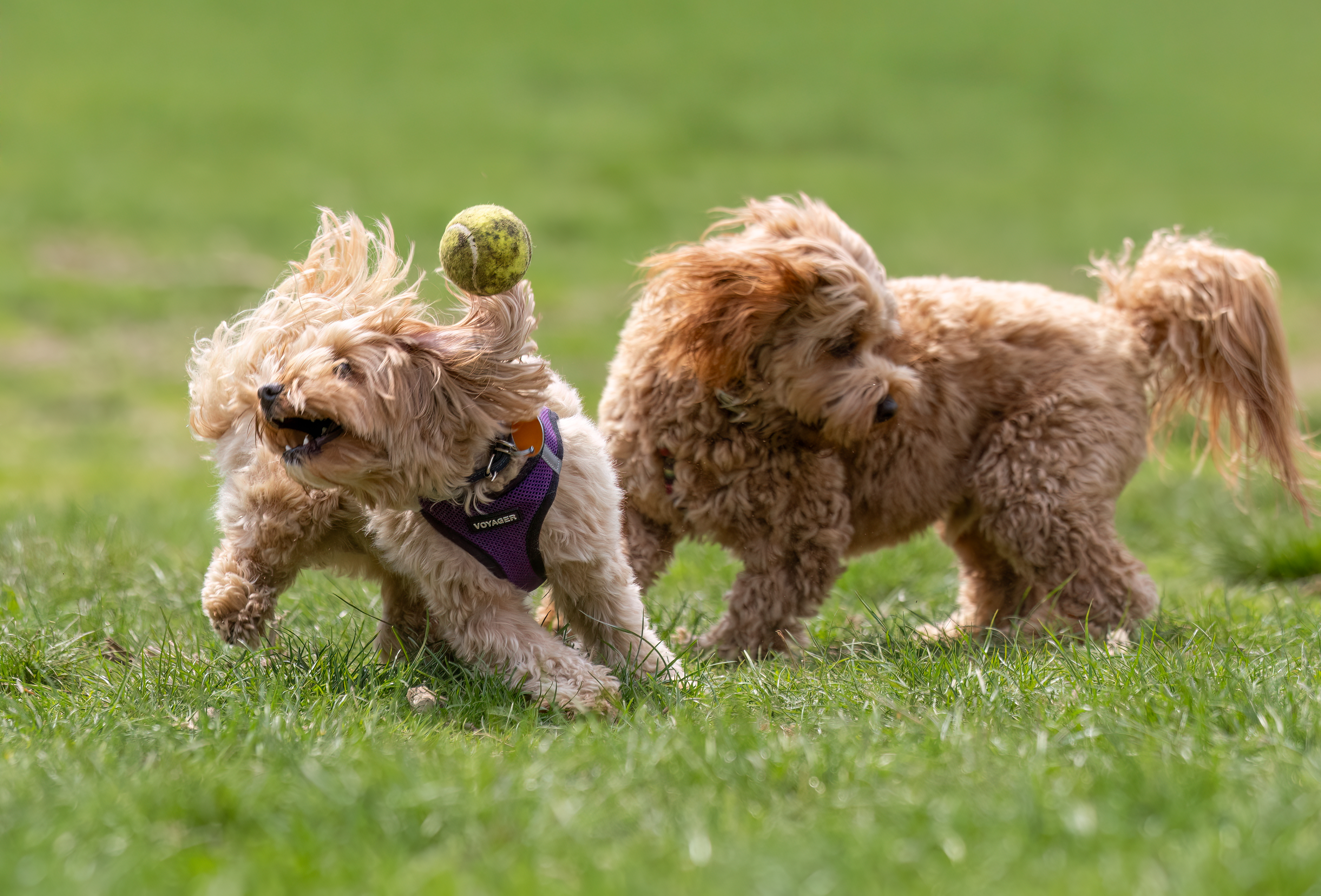
Two dogs miscalculate their object tracking paths

Perruchet and Gallego have demonstrated a method for calculating this optimal path using calculus in a different way. They propose that the dog optimizes its behaviour on a moment-to-moment basis, choosing at each moment the path that allows it to maximize its speed of approach to the ball. This requires the dog to be able to accurately estimate its speed on both land and water, but does not rely on the premise that the dog plans the entire route in advance.

== See also ==
- Least Time Principle
