= Catch (game) =

Children's game

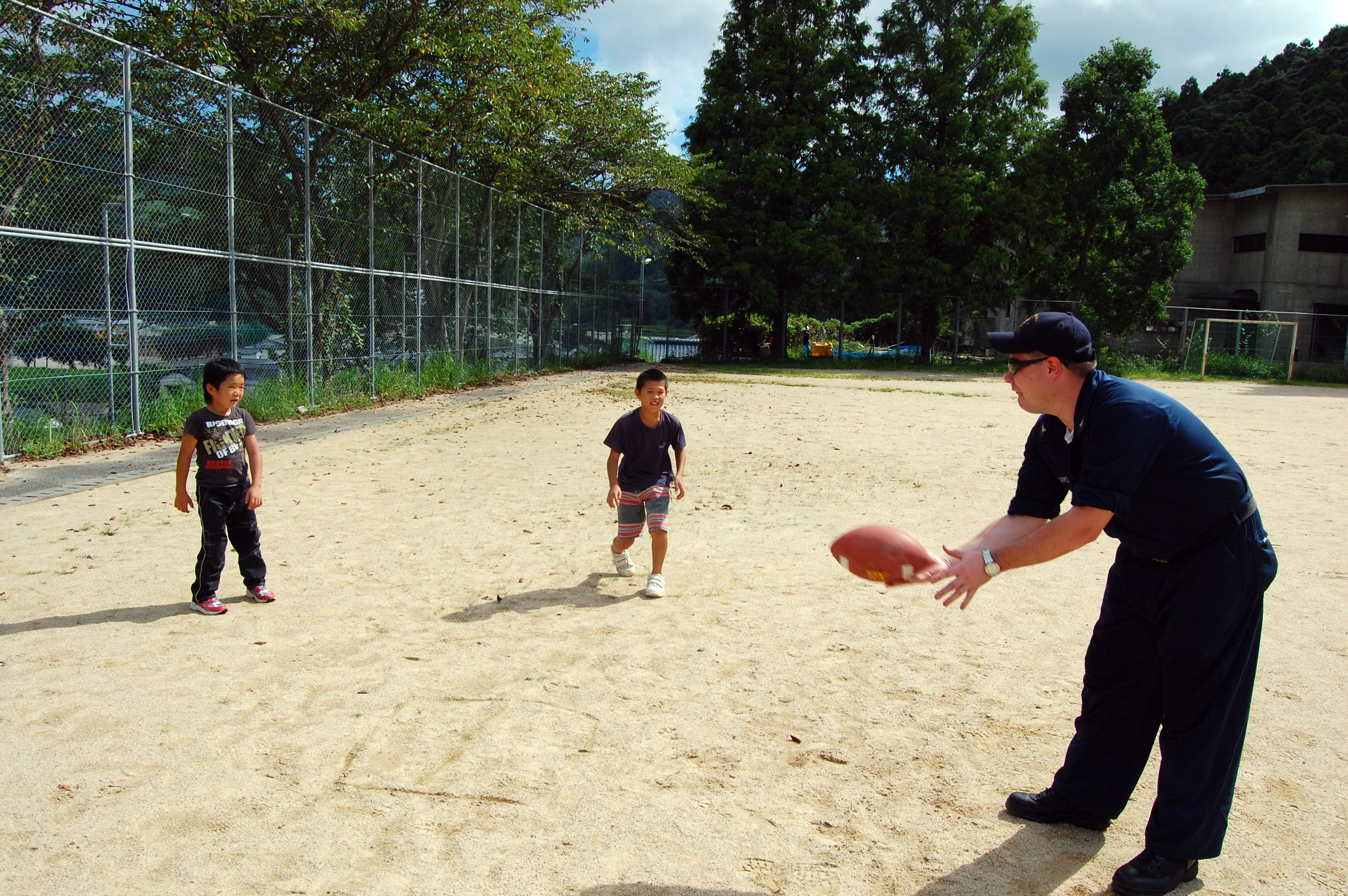
- A U.S. Navy sailor plays catch with some children in Japan.
- Genres: Sport
- Players: 2+
- Playing time: Optional
- Skills: Motor skills

Catch, playing catch, playing pass, or having a catch, is one of the most basic children's games, often played between children or between a parent and child, wherein the participants throw a ball, beanbag, flying disc or similar object back and forth to each other. At early stages in a child's life, having a catch is a good way to evaluate and improve the child's physical coordination. Notably, "[i]f a child cannot catch a ball that he or she is bouncing, it is unlikely the child will be able to play catch". Most children begin to be able to play catch around the age of four. Many four-year-olds instinctively close their eyes when a ball is heading towards them, and it can take some time to overcome this. Playing catch can help develop dexterity, coordination and confidence.

Four kids playing catch with a ball, 2013

Because playing catch requires at least two participants, and because participants can be substituted at any point during the game, catch can be used to place children in social situations where they will interact with each other. For example, this can be done by first having one child play catch with an adult, and then bringing other children into the game or substituting another child for the adult, at which point the adult can leave entirely. As children become more adept at the skills used to catch a thrown object and return it to the thrower, these skills are incorporated into more complex games played with larger groups of participants, such as hot potato, where participants must throw the ball to someone else before the music stops, dodgeball, where players must dodge or catch balls being thrown at them, and keep away, which is similar to catch but one participant in the middle must intercept the ball. Playing catch can improve an aptitude for sports that involve catching and throwing, such as bat-and-ball sports, football, and basketball.

== See also ==
- Catch (juggling)
- Fetch (game)
- Flying disc freestyle (Frisbee)
- Keep away
