= Backyard cricket =

Informal variations of cricket played outside of organized leagues

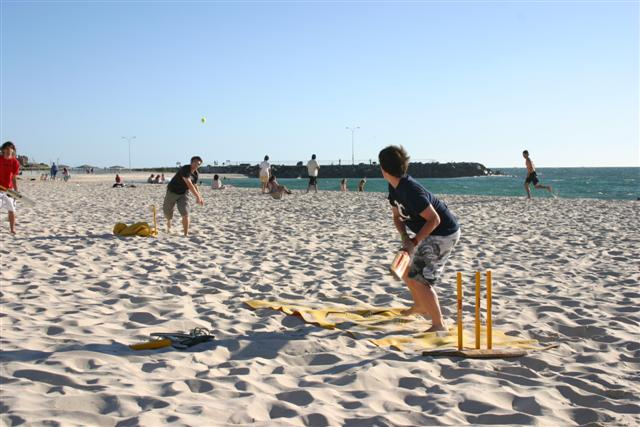
Example of beach cricket being played at Cottesloe Beach in Perth, Australia. The bowler bowls to batter, while the rest field.

Backyard cricket, also known as bat ball, bat down, street cricket, beach cricket, corridor cricket, garden cricket, gully cricket (in the Indian subcontinent) and box cricket (in instances of shorter grounds), is an informal variant of cricket. It is typically played in various non-traditional venues such as gardens, backyards, streets, parks, carparks, beaches, and any area not specifically designed for the sport.

Backyard cricket has connections to the pastimes of Australian, South African and New Zealand and English children who frequently lived on properties with large backyards, providing the facility to play this informal game of sport often with friends, family and neighbors. In South Asia, backyard cricket is very popular.

== Overview ==
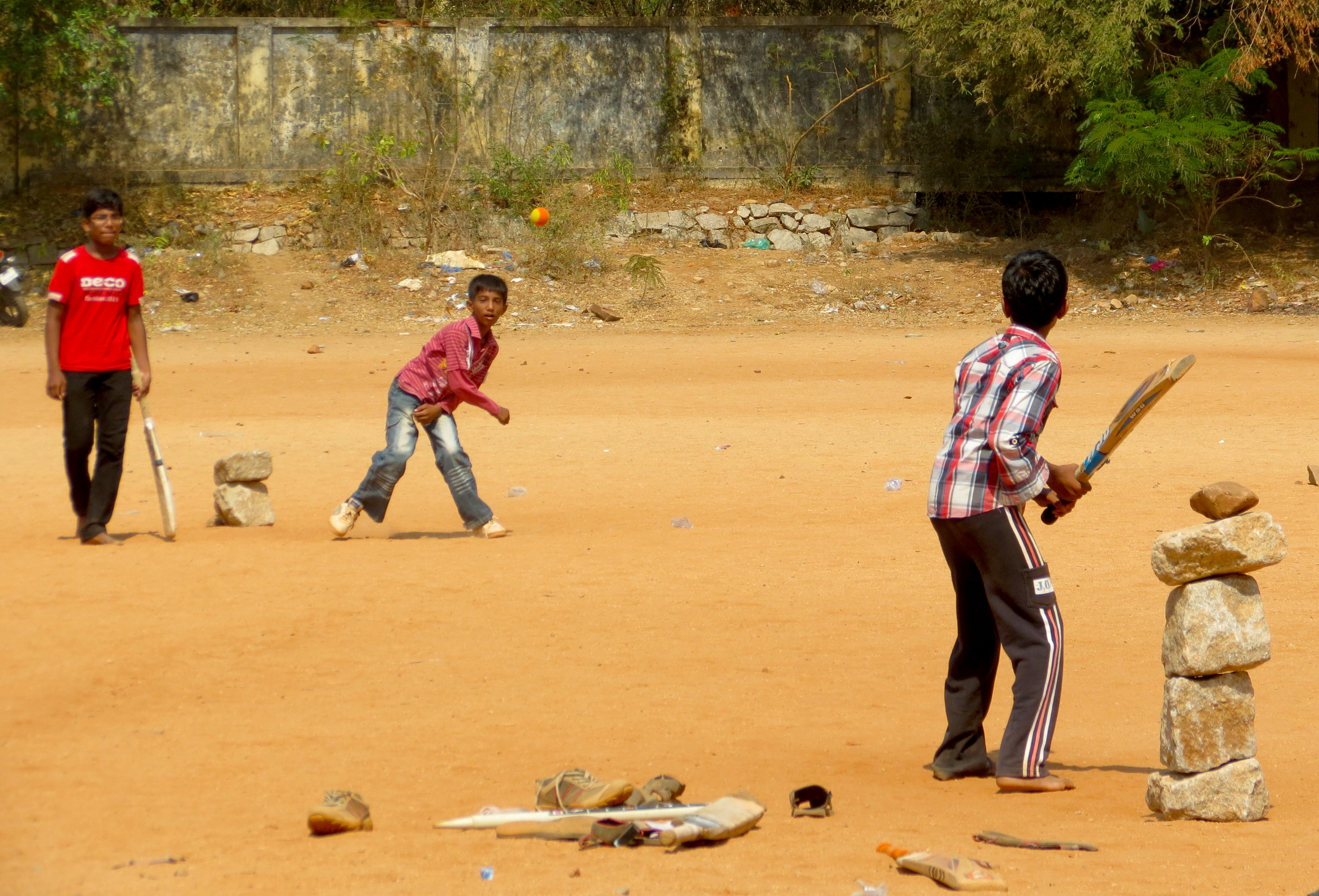
Backyard cricket—an informal variant of cricket played in Hyderabad by almost all age groups

Though loosely based upon the game of cricket, many aspects are improvised: the playing ground, the rules, the teams, and the equipment. Quite often there are no teams at all; the players take turns at batting and there is often no emphasis on actually scoring runs.

Equipment and field:

- The bat can be anything, as long as it can hit the ball and can be suitably held in the hands. However, usage of a bat is necessary.
- A ball is the other essential item.
  - Tennis balls are often used as they are less likely to inflict injuries or cause damage than a cricket ball. They are also much cheaper and more readily available than a leather cricket ball and are easier to hit due to their slower air-speed and relative lightness. Tennis balls also bounce more than normal cricket balls, especially at low speeds.
  - Sometimes a tennis ball will be heavily taped on one side to give the ball extra 'swing'. This is known as a 'swing ball' or 'tape ball'—swing balls may be made with: gaffer tape, electrical tape, plumbing tape or any other kind of tape available. A completely taped tennis ball is very popular for street cricket in Pakistan as the electric tape makes the ball heavier and less bouncy as compared to a normal tennis ball but it is still relatively harmless as compared to a real cricket ball.
- The pitch can be any stretch of ground that is reasonably flat.
- The wicket may be any convenient object—a chair, a cardboard box, a set of long twigs or sticks, a rubbish bin, tree or a drawing on the wall. Often, the wicket is by no means close to the official size, but it is used anyway.
  - A wicket at the non-striker's end is generally a single stump if proper stumps are available and in the absence of larger objects may be just a hat or a shoe. Its main purpose is to mark the bowler's crease, but can be instrumental when there are two batters and one may be run out.

Games with relatively few players typically forgo the teams and innings format of professional cricket, opting instead for a batters-vs-everyone format.

Garden/backyard cricket in South Africa and Australia is considered by many to be the pinnacle event of social and sporting excellence in the summer period. Many games are paired with a barbecue which often has a carnival atmosphere. It is historically very popular on Australia Day.

== Rules ==
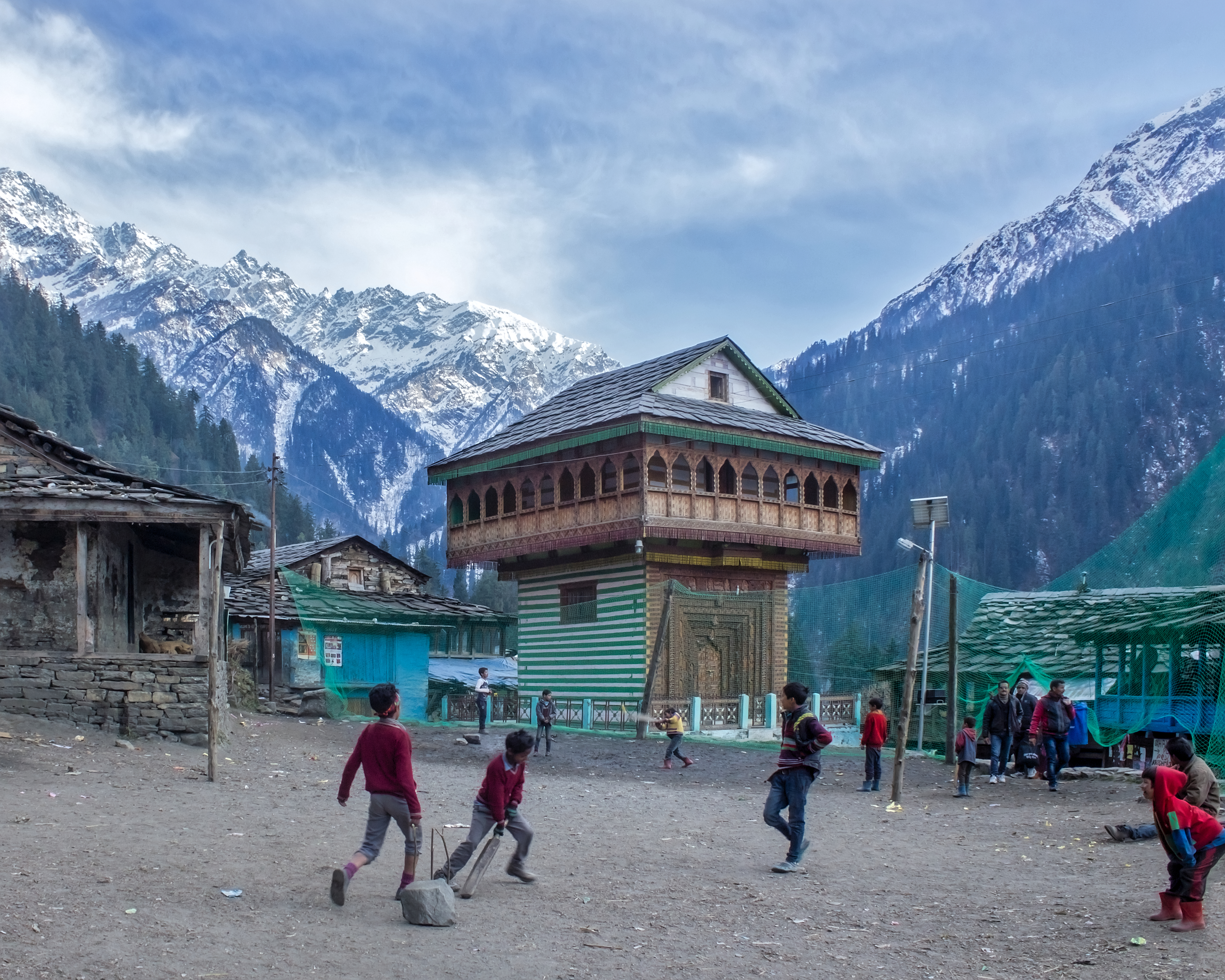
Gully cricket in a remote Himalayan village of Himachal Pradesh, India; rocks and sticks are often used as wickets.

As a generally informal contest, the rules are flexible but usually agreed upon by the players prior to playing it. Below are listed some of the most common rules.

Backyard cricket allows for rules to be changed, and the rules being played by will depend on the context and physical environment of the game, and the traditions and experience of the players. However, some rules are relatively common:

- No ducks – A batter cannot be given out without scoring. Dismissals are ignored until the batter scores at least one run.
  - First/Trial ball rule; Can't get out first ball: A stricter alternative to "no ducks" whereby a batter cannot be given out on the first ball they face (known as "trial ball" in the subcontinent). This and the "no golden ducks" rule are commonly applied to those with little cricketing skill. Sometimes this rule can also be applied on first ball of second innings (Team Batting Second).
- Equipment and field
  - Wicket material – If stumps are unavailable or unsuitable, any other material object may be used, with garbage bins (especially wheelie bins) being common, and some people also use stickers or paint lines on them or simply draw the "stumps in the wall" to restrict the "stump area" of the object to a more realistic size.
  - Pitch – The pitch should be between 11 and 33 yards (10 to 30 meters), with limiting factors such as backyard size often dictating the length.
- Ways of getting out:
  - One Hand, One Bounce – If the batter has hit the ball into the ground, but it has only bounced once, they can still be given out caught, but only if the fielder catches the ball with one hand; even if the hand hits the ground, the player is out. Another variation of this rule is a one-handed catch off the roof or fence, or some other specific structure local to the backyard in which the game is played is also out.
    - One Hand, One Bounce, One Beer – An alternate to the rule of One Hand, One Bounce, where the fielder must also be in possession of a beverage (traditionally a beer) in order to enact the rule and get the batter out. However, spilling a significant proportion of the beverage may be deemed enough to nullify the catch.
    - 'Current' rule: Fielders can hold the ball in a hand and step on the wicket, rather than hitting the wicket with the ball, to effect a runout.
  - No LBW – As many backyard cricket games are without umpires, or self-umpired, or played with juniors, teams may agree to not use the relatively difficult LBW rule.
    - Another alternative is "Auto-LBW", by which the batter is always deemed to be out in almost any possible LBW scenario; it also has the effects of discouraging purely defensive batting, and typically increases the rotation of batters.
    - Three hits on the body can get the batter out in gully cricket, wicket and bete-ombro.
  - Six and Out – If the ball is hit over the fence, the batter is out, and is obliged to retrieve the ball. The six runs are awarded to the batter to reflect the great shot that they have hit. This rule is especially popular in small backyards (where the rule may be applied to any ball that lands over the fence, not just sixes), and encourages the batter to exercise control and restraint by aiming for fours instead of sixes. In street cricket, the rule applies if the ball goes into the neighbour's front garden/yard. Six-and-out is also often extended to include nearby fragile objects such as windows and cars which are declared out-of-bounds; if a ball hits an out-of-bounds object on the full it is deemed six-and-out, even if no damage is evident.
  - Automatic Wickie – (also known as Electric Wickie/Keeper) If playing in front of a garage door or similar, the structure takes on the role of wicket keeper. Any balls making contact with the Auto Wickie without bouncing, or "on the full", is considered out. Catches (i.e. from snicks) also apply.
  - Retire at X – All batters must retire (end their turn) once they reach a certain pre-declared number of runs (such as 20, 50 or 100). This prevents anyone "hogging the bat", and helps ensure everyone gets a chance to bat.
- Lost Ball – If a lost ball cannot be found, and if there is no replacement ball, the match ends effective immediately. If losing the ball was the result of hitting a six-and-out the batter is declared the loser. Other scenarios may result in the match deemed a No Contest, or the highest-scoring batter declared the winner.
- Running to score runs
  - Hit and Run – (also known as "Tip and Run", "tip and go", "tippy-go", "tippany" or "tippety") Like in baseball, if the batter's bat makes contact with the ball, they must run.
  - No running between wickets – Players may agree that batters don't run between the wickets, a rule often applied on hot summer days or if players are injured, aged, or otherwise infirmed. As a result, batters typically cannot be run out, but they can still be stumped if found out of their crease. In order to score, they must hit 4's (or 6's if allowed).
- Rules for fielders:
  - Dogs – Dogs are considered fielders, and they effectively switch teams with each innings to constantly remain on the fielding team. If a dog catches the ball (the one-bounce rule is also often allowed), or if the dog (or any other pet) is hit by the ball on-the-full, the batter is declared out. It is the responsibility of the fielding team to chase dogs when required, but ultimately it is the responsibility of the bowler to clean the ball of any slobber.
- Extra Player – If both teams have an even number of players and there is one extra person, they are considered a joker player ("Kacha limbu.") also known as "Common Player". The joker is part of both teams. The joker is also known as Bothey. The joker is required to field in both innings, but they are not allowed to bowl. However, they are allowed to bat on both sides of the team. They are allowed to bat in any order. Depending on the agreement of both captains, they can be restricted to bat last.
- Toss – The coin toss plays an important role in backyard cricket like it does in international play. The captain that wins the toss may choose to bat first, or choose the first player. The cricket bat itself is often used in place of a coin, where the call is in respect to whether the bat tossed in the air lands with its flat side upwards or downwards. Otherwise, the chocolate wrappers/paper/or any other eligible item is taken as toss and two sides (mainly considered either colour sides e.g. Blue/Red or Language sides where both sides were written in different languages e.g. Hindi or English)

If the game is not played individually, the person who owns the bat and ball may choose to bat first.

== Beach cricket ==
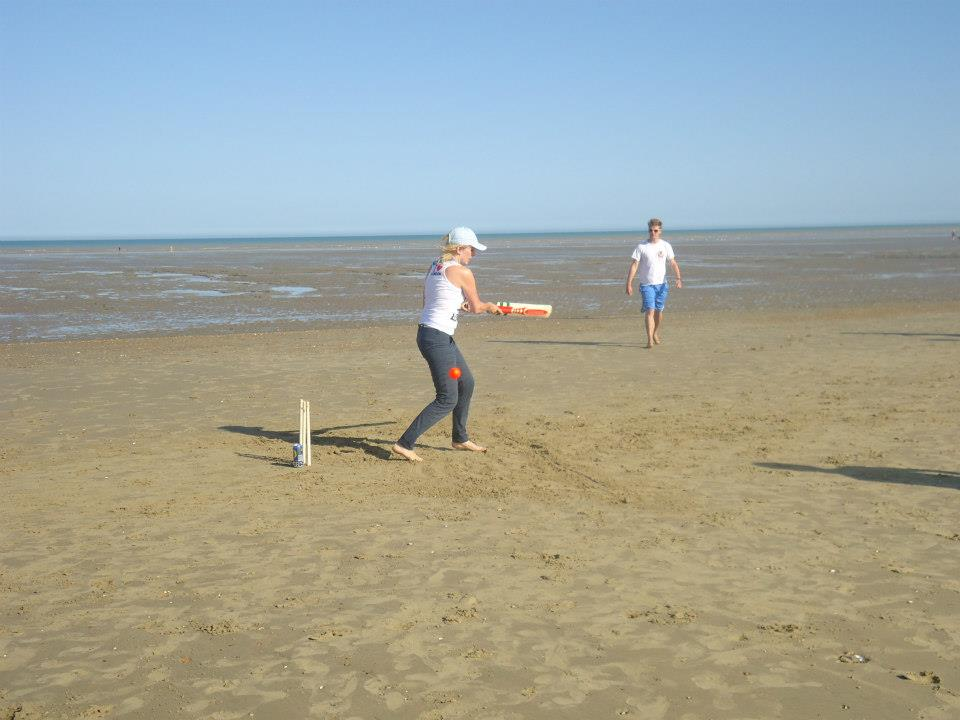
In this example the tide is out and so the field of play is greatly increased.

Play on an actual beach can be achieved either by using the flat strip of hard-packed sand along the surf line as the pitch, or by only "bowling" gentle full tosses to avoid the problem of the ball not bouncing off loose sand. If there are no true stumps available, then a bin, deckchair, boogie board or cool box may be used. Tennis balls are often used in place of cricket balls as they float in the water and don't get bogged in the sand as easily.

In beach cricket the creases and the boundary are normally drawn in the sand in a line which extends well past the side of the agreed pitch to prevent them becoming obliterated in the first over. The batters will frequently redraw the line. Sometimes, play is shifted along the beach to a new pitch as the packed sand of the original pitch is turned up, thus reducing the standard of or even completely disabling bowling. The tide plays a big part in the standard of the pitch in beach cricket. During low tide, the pitch tends to be on the semi-wet sand, and is deemed superior than cricket played in high tide (when the pitch is on dryer, looser sand). In particularly long matches, the play will shift up and down the beach depending on the tide.

== History ==
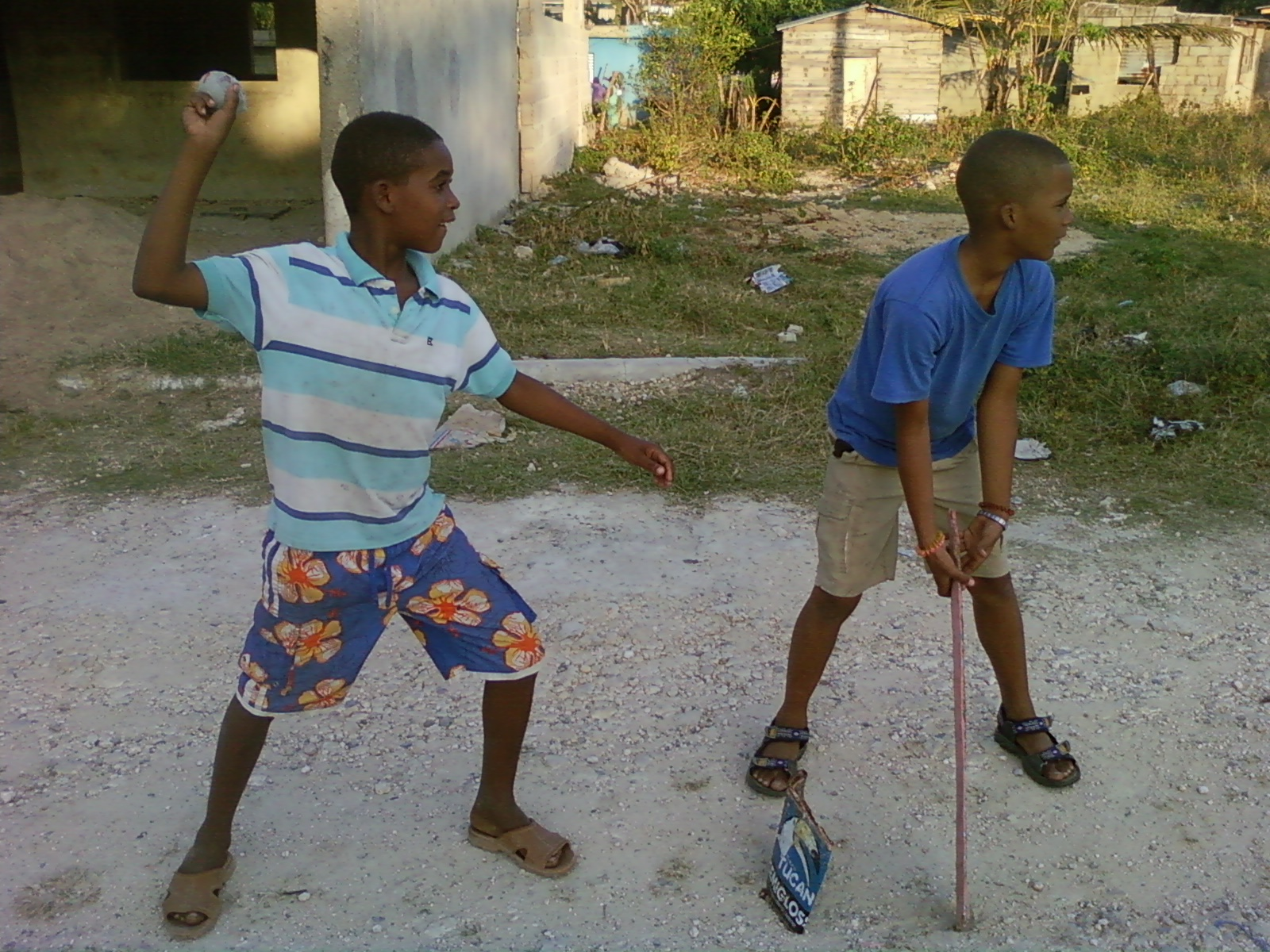
A plaquita bowler about to bowl, with the nonstriker in his crease. Plaquita is a form of Dominican street cricket likely originating from British and West Indian influences.

A major element of contemporary street cricket is the use of a tennis ball; in Pakistan, tennis balls began to be covered in tape in the late 20th century and turned into a "tape ball". Tape ball cricket is played to the greatest extent in Pakistan, where it likely originated.

Several street variants of cricket exist in Latin America, such as bete-ombro and plaquita. In nearby Suriname, there is a game called "bat-en-bal" which is likely derived from cricket; in bat-en-bal, one end of the pitch has a set of stumps.

In March 2024, the first season of the Indian Street Premier League (ISPL) took place, which featured several elements of Indian street cricket such as the use of a tennis ball. The ISPL's goal is to prioritize the advancement of poorer cricket players and support the growth of tennis ball cricket.

== See also ==
- Backyard Ashes
- Bete-ombro
- Catch (Note: children's game of catching the ball or object such as Frisbee)
- Flying disc sports
- French cricket
- Lawn game
- Stickball
- Wiffleball
