= Plaquita =

Game similar to cricket in Dominican Republic

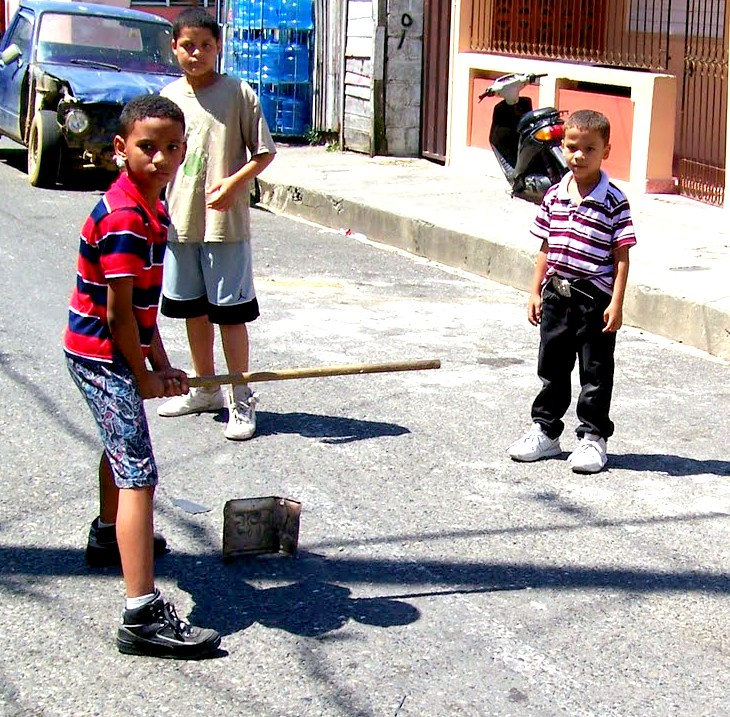
A batter stands in front of his makeshift wicket

La plaquita or la placa (English: little plate) is a bat-and-ball game played in the Dominican Republic with many similarities to cricket.

Several Dominican MLB baseball players have attested to playing it as children.

== Rules ==
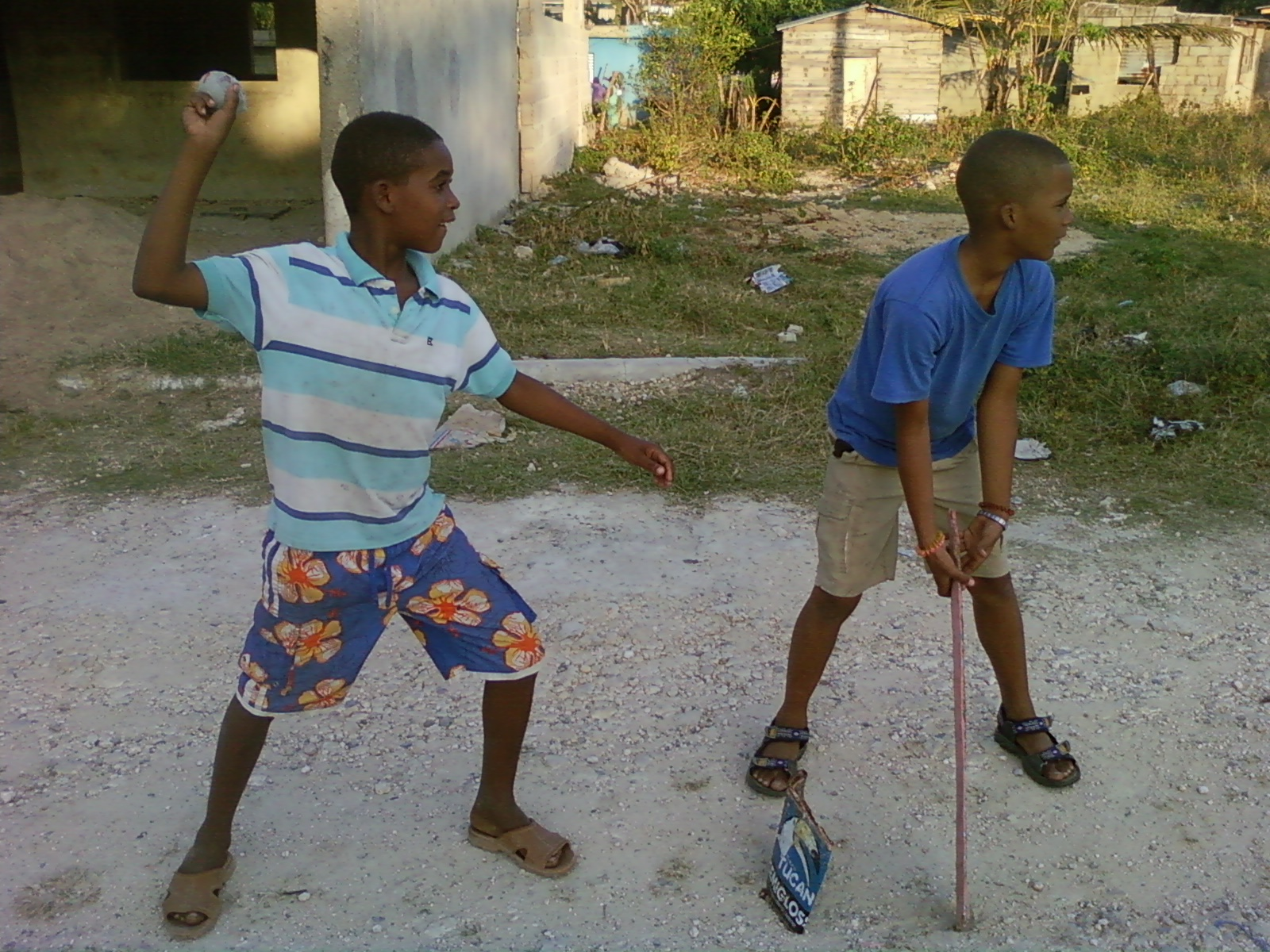
The bowler prepares to throw the ball to the striker

Two teams of two players take turns fielding and batting. There are two wickets which are license plates (called placas in Spanish), with one fielder behind and one batter in front of each wicket. One of the fielding team's players throws the ball to the batter at the opposite wicket, who may then try to hit it. The fielding team's goal is to bowl the batter out by knocking over the wicket with the ball. Batters run between the wickets to score runs, with one run scored for each swap of the batters, though they can be gotten out if a fielder runs them out by hitting a wicket with the ball while they are away from it. The batting team switches with the fielding team once their batters have gotten out three times, with the team that is first to 12 runs winning the game.

== See also ==
- Bete-ombro, a very similar Brazilian version of cricket
- Vitilla, another famous Dominican street bat-and-ball game
