= Outline of baseball =

Overview of and topical guide to baseball

The following outline is provided as an overview of and topical guide to baseball:

Baseball – bat-and-ball sport played between two teams of nine players each. The aim is to score runs by hitting a thrown ball with a bat and touching a series of four bases arranged at the corners of a ninety-foot diamond.

== What type of thing is baseball? ==
- Exercise – bodily activity that enhances or maintains physical fitness and overall health or wellness.
- Game – structured activity, usually undertaken for enjoyment and sometimes used as an educational tool. Games are distinct from work, which is usually carried out for remuneration, and from art, which is more concerned with the expression of ideas. However, the distinction is not clear-cut, and many games are also considered to be work (such as professional sports).
  - Ball game – game played with a ball.
    - Bat-and-ball game – field game played by two teams which alternate between "batting" and "fielding" roles. The fielding team defends, so only the batting team may score, but they have equal chances in both roles.
- Sport – form of physical activity which, through casual or organised participation, aim to use, maintain or improve physical fitness and provide entertainment to participants.
  - Competitive sport – sport in which one or more participants or teams compete against one another. The one that is the most successful in achieving the objective of the game or sport event is the winner.
  - Team sport – sport that involves players working together towards a shared objective.
  - Recreational sport – sport engaged in as a leisure time activity.
  - Spectator sport – sport that is characterized by the presence of spectators, or watchers, at its matches. Spectator sports are a form of entertainment.
  - Professional sport – sport in which the athletes receive payment for their performance.

== General baseball concepts ==
=== Equipment of the game ===
- Baseball bat
- Baseball (ball)
- Baseball glove
- Baseball field
  - Batter's eye
  - Bullpen
  - Infield
  - On-deck
  - Outfield
  - Warning track

=== Rules of the game ===
- Baseball rules
  - Balk
  - Baseball field
  - Baserunning
  - Batting out of turn
  - Bunt
  - Business rules (see The Official Professional Baseball Rules Book)
  - Catch
  - Defensive substitution
  - Designated hitter
  - Double switch
  - Extra innings
  - Fair ball
  - Force play
  - Forfeit
  - Foul ball
  - Foul tip
  - Fourth out
  - Ground rule double
  - Ground rules
  - Hit
  - Hit by pitch
  - Home run
  - In flight
  - Infield fly rule
  - Injured list (historically known as "disabled list")
  - Inning
  - Instant replay in baseball
  - Interference
  - Knickerbocker Rules
  - Live ball
  - Neighborhood play
  - Obstruction
  - Out
  - Pace of play
  - Pitch clock
  - Pitching position
  - Quick pitch
  - Rainout
  - Run
  - Rundown
  - Safe
  - Strike zone
  - Suspended game
  - Tag out
  - Tag up
  - Time of pitch
  - Uncaught third strike

== History of baseball ==
- History of baseball
  - Origins of baseball

== Baseball leagues, teams, and organizations ==
=== National team competitions ===
- Baseball World Cup
- World Baseball Classic
- WBSC Premier12
- Baseball at the Summer Olympics
- Baseball at the Pan American Games

=== In North America ===
- Major League Baseball

- National League
  - Atlanta Braves
  - Arizona Diamondbacks
  - Chicago Cubs
  - Cincinnati Reds
  - Colorado Rockies
  - Los Angeles Dodgers
  - Miami Marlins
  - Milwaukee Brewers
  - New York Mets
  - Philadelphia Phillies
  - Pittsburgh Pirates
  - San Diego Padres
  - San Francisco Giants
  - St. Louis Cardinals
  - Washington Nationals
- American League
  - Baltimore Orioles
  - Boston Red Sox
  - Chicago White Sox
  - Cleveland Indians
  - Detroit Tigers
  - Houston Astros
  - Kansas City Royals
  - Los Angeles Angels
  - Minnesota Twins
  - New York Yankees
  - Oakland Athletics
  - Seattle Mariners
  - Tampa Bay Rays
  - Texas Rangers
  - Toronto Blue Jays

- Minor League Baseball
  - see List of Minor League Baseball leagues and teams
- Mexican League
- Winter Leagues
  - Colombian Professional Baseball League
  - Dominican Winter Baseball League
  - Mexican Pacific League
  - Puerto Rico Baseball League
  - Venezuelan Professional Baseball League
- Amateur baseball in the United States
  - National Baseball Congress
  - National Adult Baseball Association
  - American Legion Baseball
  - NCAA Baseball
  - American Amateur Baseball Congress
  - Pony League
  - Little League

=== Other Latin American leagues ===
- Brazilian Baseball Championship
- Pan American Baseball Confederation (COPABE)
- Baseball in Cuba
  - Cuba national baseball team
  - Cuban National Series
- Nicaraguan Professional Baseball League

=== Baseball in Europe ===
- Confederation of European Baseball
- European Cup
- Austrian Baseball League
- Vlaamse Baseball en Softball Liga (Belgium)
- Ligue Francophone Belge de Baseball-Softball (Belgium)
- Ceskomoravska League (Czech Republic)
- Croatian Baseball League
- Division Élite (France)
- Bundesliga (Germany)
- British Baseball Federation (Great Britain)
- Hellenic Amateur Baseball Federation (Greece)
- Danish Baseball Federation
- Irish Baseball League
- Italian Baseball League
- Honkbal Hoofdklasse (Netherlands)
- Norway Softball and Baseball Federation
- Portuguese Baseball and Softball Federation
- Slovak Baseball Federation (Slovakia)
- División de Honor de Béisbol (Spain)
- Elitserien (Sweden)
- Turkish Baseball Softball American Football and Rugby Federation
- Federation Baseball Softball Ukraine

=== Baseball in Asia ===
- Nippon Professional Baseball (Japan)

- Central League
  - Chunichi Dragons
  - Hanshin Tigers
  - Hiroshima Carp
  - Tokyo Yakult Swallows
  - Yokohama BayStars
  - Yomiuri Giants
- Pacific League
  - Chiba Lotte Marines
  - Fukuoka SoftBank Hawks
  - Hokkaido Nippon-Ham Fighters
  - Orix Buffaloes
  - Saitama Seibu Lions
  - Tohoku Rakuten Golden Eagles

- China Baseball League (People's Republic of China)
- Korea Professional Baseball (Korea)
- Baseball Philippines
- Chinese Professional Baseball League (Taiwan)

=== Baseball in Africa ===
- African Baseball & Softball Association

=== Baseball in Oceania ===
- Australian Baseball League
- New Zealand Baseball

=== Defunct leagues ===
- Negro league baseball
  - Leagues
    - Negro National League (1920–31)
    - Eastern Colored League (1923–28)
    - American Negro League (1929)
    - Negro Southern League (1920–36), minor league
    - East-West League (1932)
    - Negro National League (1933–48)
    - Negro Southern League (1945–51), minor league
    - Negro American League (1937–60)
  - Teams in the Negro leagues
    - Atlanta Black Crackers (1920–52)
    - Atlantic City Bacharach Giants (1919–34)
    - Baltimore Black Sox (1916–34)
    - Baltimore Elite Giants (1920–50)
    - Birmingham Black Barons (1920–60)
    - Brooklyn Royal Giants (1910–42)
    - Chattanooga Choo-Choos (1940–46)
    - Chicago American Giants (1920–52)
    - Cleveland Buckeyes (1942–50)
    - Cuban Stars (1920–30)
    - Detroit Stars (1920–33, 1937)
    - Hilldale Darbie Daisies (1916–32)
    - Homestead Grays (1929–48)
    - Indianapolis ABCs (1912–26)
    - Indianapolis Clowns (1943–50)
    - Jacksonville Red Caps (1938–42)
    - Kansas City Monarchs (1920–65)
    - Memphis Red Sox (1923–62)
    - New York Black Yankees (1936–48)
    - New York Cubans (1935–50)
    - New York Lincoln Giants (1911–30)
    - Newark Eagles (1933–50)
    - Philadelphia Stars (1934–52)
    - Pittsburgh Crawfords (1931–38)
    - St. Louis Stars (1922–31)
- Former Major Leagues
  - American Association (1882–91)
  - Union Association (1884)
  - Players' League (1890)
  - Federal League (1914–15)
- Cuban League
- All-American Girls Professional Baseball League

== Baseball publications ==
- Baseball America
- Baseball Magazine
- Baseball Digest
- Baseball Hobby News

== Persons influential in baseball ==
=== Contributors ===
- List of members of the Baseball Hall of Fame
- Ford C. Frick Award, presented annually by the Hall of Fame for excellence in baseball broadcasting (article includes a list of honorees)
- BBWAA Career Excellence Award, presented annually by the Baseball Writers' Association of America for excellence in baseball writing (article includes a list of honorees)
- Buck O'Neil Lifetime Achievement Award, presented no more often than every three years by the Hall of Fame for outstanding contributions to baseball's image (article includes a list of honorees)
- People not directly connected with the sport who nevertheless made a contribution:
  - Roger Angell, essayist and Spink Award winner
  - Ken Burns, documentarian
  - Charles Feltman, inventor of the hot dog
  - Bill James, author and statistician
  - Michael Lewis, author of Moneyball
  - Topps Chewing Gum, producer of baseball cards

=== Players ===
- Lists of Major League Baseball players
- List of 19th-century baseball players
- List of Negro league baseball players

=== Umpires ===
- List of Major League Baseball umpires (disambiguation)

=== Managers and coaches ===
- List of Major League Baseball managers with most career wins
- List of college baseball career coaching wins leaders

=== Owners ===
- List of Major League Baseball principal owners

== See also ==
- Outline of sports
