= In flight =

Possible state of the ball in baseball

In baseball, the rules state that a batted ball is considered in flight when it has not yet touched any object other than a fielder or his equipment. Such a ball can be caught by a fielder to put the batter out.

Once a batted ball touches the ground, a fence or wall, a foul pole, a base, the pitcher's rubber, an umpire, or a baserunner, it is no longer in flight. A batted ball that passes entirely out of the playing field ceases to be in flight when that occurs; if it was between the foul poles at that moment, then it is a home run which entitles the batter (and any other runners on base) to score.

A special rule exists in covered baseball facilities (retractable or fixed roofed), where a batted ball striking the roof, roof supporting structure, or objects suspended from the roof (e.g., speakers) while in fair territory is still considered to be in flight. Rules for batted balls striking any of those objects in foul territory differ between ballparks, with most considering such a ball to still be in flight, and some considering it to be a foul ball and dead from the time it strikes.

== Fly out ==
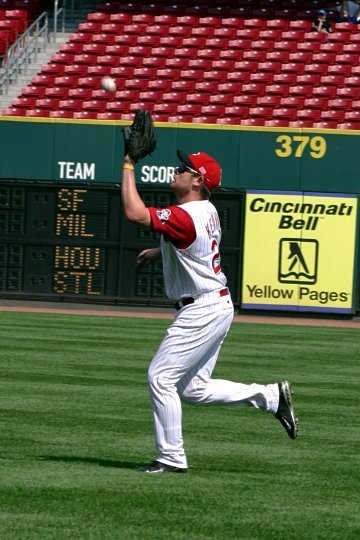
Fly out in the outfield.

If a batted ball (other than a foul tip, with less than 2 strikes) is caught in flight, the batter is out—called a fly out—and all runners must tag up, meaning that they are out if a fielder with possession of the ball touches their starting base (time-of-pitch base) before they do. A batted ball cannot be ruled foul or fair while in flight; a batted ball that is past first or third base will be called foul or fair based on where it ceases to be in flight, or where it is first touched by a fielder, whichever occurs first. A fly out on a ball in foul territory is also called a foul out. A foul tip, which by definition is always caught in flight, is a strike by special rule, and not an out, unless caught as a 3rd strike.

== Home run ==
If a batted ball passes out of the playing field in flight and is fair, it is an automatic home run, entitling the batter and all runners to score without liability to be put out. However, if the fence or other barrier is less than 250 feet from home plate, a ball hit past that fence in flight and fair shall be ruled an automatic double. In the United States, such short fences are very rare even in the lowest-level amateur ballfields. Fields with short fences can be commonplace in some countries where baseball is less popular; often, soccer fields have to be used, resulting in a very short left or right field.

The shortest fair fences in Major League Baseball are both in Boston's Fenway Park; the shortest fence that is nearly perpendicular to the foul line is the Green Monster. The left foul pole, renamed "Fisk's Pole" in honor of Carlton Fisk's famous home run in the 1975 World Series, stands 310 feet away from home plate. The right field foul pole, known as Pesky's Pole, is 302 feet down the right field line, although the wall there is nearly parallel to the foul line as it curves back to the distant right field wall at 380 feet. From 1958 through 1961, the Los Angeles Dodgers played home games in Los Angeles Memorial Coliseum, a stadium built for track and field; without the ability to move any of the permanent stadium structure, the Dodgers configured the field to result in a 251-foot left field foul line distance.

== See also ==
- Bouncing ball
- Caught out (cricket)
