= Single (baseball) =

One-base hit in baseball

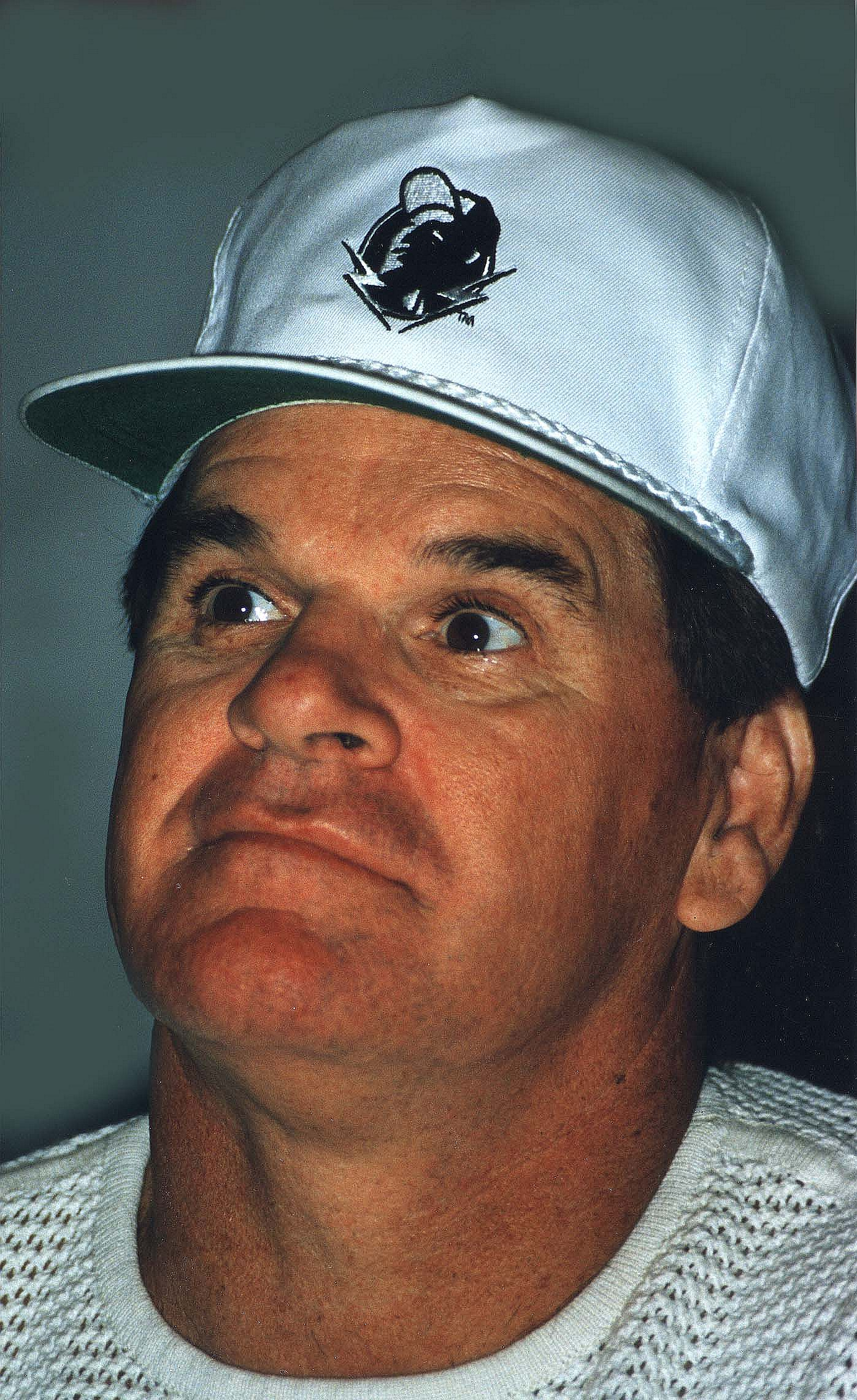
Pete Rose is Major League Baseball's all-time leader in singles.

In baseball, a single is the most common type of base hit, accomplished through the act of a batter safely reaching first base by hitting a fair ball (thus becoming a runner) and getting to first base before a fielder puts him out. As an exception, a batter-runner reaching first base safely is not credited with a single when an infielder attempts to put out another runner on the first play; this is one type of a fielder's choice. Also, a batter-runner reaching first base on a play due to a fielder's error trying to put him out at first base or another runner out (as a fielder's choice) is not credited with a single.

On a single hit to the outfield, any runners on second base or third base normally score, and sometimes the runner from first base is able to advance to third base. Depending on the location of the hit, a quick recovery by the outfielder can prevent such an advance or create a play on the advancing runner.

Hitters who focus on hitting singles rather than doubles or home runs are often called "contact hitters". Contact hitters who rely on positioning their hits well and having fast running speed to achieve singles are often called "slap hitters". Ty Cobb, Pete Rose, Tony Gwynn, and Ichiro Suzuki are examples of contact hitters; of these, Rose and Suzuki might be called slap hitters.

Unlike doubles or other types of extra base hits, singles do not remove the possibility of multiple force plays on the next fair ball; in fact, the batter achieving the single will be forced to advance to second base on the next play, creating the possibility of a force double play.

== Symbol ==
There is no universally accepted symbol for a single. Most often, singles are not reported; rather, the total number of hits, doubles, triples, and home runs is reported; then, hits minus these "extra base hits" yields the number of singles.

Sometimes, 1B is used as the symbol for singles; however, this symbol is more commonly used for the first baseman or for first base itself. Another possible symbol is a horizontal line, -. The letter S is never used as a symbol for single, because it is the symbol for strike.

== Singles leaders, Major League Baseball ==
=== Career ===
1. Pete Rose - 3,215
2. Ty Cobb - 3,053
3. Eddie Collins - 2,643
4. Cap Anson - 2,598
5. Derek Jeter - 2,595
6. Willie Keeler -2,513
7. Ichiro Suzuki - 2,464
8. Honus Wagner - 2,422
9. Rod Carew - 2,404
10. Tris Speaker - 2,383

=== Season ===
1. Ichiro Suzuki (2004) - 225
2. Willie Keeler (1898) - 206
3. Ichiro Suzuki (2007) - 203
4. Lloyd Waner (1927) - 198
5. Willie Keeler (1897) - 193

=== Game ===
Johnny Burnett holds the record for most singles in a game. He hit seven singles on July 10, 1932, for the Cleveland Indians in an 18–17 loss to the Philadelphia Athletics. 19 players have hit six singles in a game.

== See also ==
- Infield hit
- Single (cricket)
- Double (baseball)
- Triple (baseball)
- Home Run
