= Dead ball =

Term in many ball sports

Dead ball is a term in many ball sports in which the ball is deemed temporarily not playable, and no movement may be made with it. Depending on the sport, this event may be quite routine, or more uncommon.

== Basketball ==
In basketball, most or any time play is stopped the ball is considered dead, such as when a foul has been committed and called by a referee, a foul shot has been attempted and another one is yet to be attempted, or the ball has gone out of bounds. Player substitutions may then be made. Section IV of the NBA rule book contains the official definition of a dead ball.

== Bat and ball sports ==
=== Baseball ===
In baseball, when the ball is dead, no runners may advance beyond the respective bases they are entitled to, and no runners may be put out. The ball becomes dead when:

- A batter is touched by a pitch or a batted ball (hit by pitch)
- The plate umpire hinders a catcher's throw attempt and the throw does not directly retire a runner
- A ball is illegally batted, such as when a batter hits the ball while outside of the batter's box
- A foul ball is not caught
- A fair ball touches a runner or an umpire on fair territory before it touches an infielder (including the pitcher)
- A fair ball touches a runner or an umpire before it has passed an infielder other than the pitcher
- A live ball lodges in the umpire's or catcher's equipment or in a fence or in another object on the field
- Any legal pitch touches a runner trying to score
- A live ball passes out of the playing field (unless it hits or crosses over a base on the ground)
- A runner or spectator commits interference
- The defense leaves the field after the half inning or game ends
- The venue's ground rules call for a dead ball ruling for a ball striking an above-ground obstruction (usually involving the roof of a domed or retractable-roofed stadium), such as the Tampa Bay Rays' Tropicana Field, regarding the catwalks and overhanging speakers above the field. In the past, overhead dead ball ground rules also existed for the Kingdome in Seattle and Minneapolis's Hubert H. Humphrey Metrodome
- An umpire calls time. Umpires typically call "time" after being asked to do so by a participant. An umpire in chief (plate umpire) will also call "time" when:
  - Weather, darkness or similar conditions make play impossible or dangerous
  - Light failure makes it difficult or impossible for the umpires to follow the play
  - An accident incapacitates a player or an umpire
  - The umpire wishes to examine the ball, to consult with either manager, or for any similar cause.
  - An umpire orders a player or any other person removed from the playing field.
  - A balk or obstruction is committed and immediate ensuing play ends
  - The catcher interferes with the batter before the time of pitch
  - An umpire declares "no pitch" after debris or a flying object (such as a bird) collides with the pitched ball.

In general, the ball does not automatically become dead after playing action ends. So, for example, although the recording of a third out generally winds down a half inning, the ball is not automatically dead. If it is to the advantage of the defense to attempt to record a fourth out for any reason, the ball is live and such a play is permitted.

After a dead ball, the ball becomes alive again when the pitcher stands on the pitcher's plate ready to pitch, the batter, catcher and umpire are ready, and the umpire calls or signals "Play."

Players and coaches may ask an umpire for "time", but they themselves may not call "time" and cause the ball to become dead. Nevertheless, "time" is usually granted by the umpire when asked, and thus, colloquially, it is often said that players or coaches indeed can "call time". Unlike sports which have clocks to time the play, the phrase "time out" is not used in baseball. Likewise, there is no limit to the number of times a team can "call time".

In baseball, the term "dead ball" is also used in the context of the dead-ball era, a phase during the early history of the game in the early 1900s. In this context, the ball was not actually "dead" but for various reasons tended to be difficult to hit for distance, resulting in low scores and few home runs by modern standards.

In Japan, the term "dead ball" (デッドボール, deddo bōru) exclusively means hit by pitch (the event itself). "Ball dead" (ボールデッド, bōru deddo) is used instead to mean the state of play.

=== Cricket ===
In cricket, a dead ball is a particular state of play in which the players may not perform any of the active aspects of the game, meaning batters may not score runs and fielders may not attempt to get batters out.

"The words 'dead ball' were first used in the laws in 1798", in relation to a new law imposing a penalty of five runs if the fielder stopped the ball with his hat. "Before 1798 the words 'dead ball' were not used but the meaning was implicit in some of the other laws of the day."

The ball, referring to the cricket ball, becomes live when the bowler begins their run up in preparation to bowl at the batter. In the live state, play occurs with the batters able to score runs and get out.

The ball becomes dead when any of the following situations occur:

- The umpire is satisfied that, with adequate reason, the batter is not ready for the delivery of the ball.
- The ball is finally settled in the hands of the wicket-keeper or of the bowler and that this determination is at the sole discretion of the umpire.
- A boundary is scored
- A batter is dismissed. The ball will be deemed to be dead from the instant of the incident causing the dismissal.
- A ball, whether played or not, becomes trapped between the bat and person of a batter or between items of his/her clothing or equipment or the clothing of an umpire.
- The ball lodges in a protective helmet worn by a fielder.
- The umpire intervenes in the occurrence of injury or unfair play.
- Additionally, Law 20.1.2 states that "The ball shall be considered to be dead when it is clear to the bowler's end umpire that the fielding side and both batters at the wicket have ceased to regard it as in play".

Umpires may also call dead ball at their discretion, in the case of a series for events for which there is no provision in either the Laws of Cricket or agreements made prior to the match. This happened on 9 October 2005, when Australian batter Michael Hussey hit the retracted roof at the Telstra Dome. What would have been six in an open stadium was ruled a dead ball, and no runs were awarded.

Note that the ball becomes dead as soon as a batter is out, so it is not possible to dismiss the other batter immediately. Thus the baseball concept of a double play cannot occur in cricket.

If necessary to make it clear to the players and scorers that the umpire considers the ball to be dead, the umpire signals dead ball by crossing and uncrossing his arms in front of his body.

== Football codes ==
=== Association football ===
In association football (soccer), the term "dead ball" refers to a situation when the ball is not in play, e.g. when play has not been restarted after the ball has gone out of bounds or a foul has been committed. It also applies before each kick-off, either at the start of each half or after a goal has been scored. In a dead ball situation, players can position the ball with their hands prior to restarting play. Furthermore, even though the ball is not in play, the referee may still issue cautions or ejections (yellow or red cards) for any incident that occurs off the ball. Fouls, on the other hand, can occur only while the ball is in play.

=== Gridiron football ===
In gridiron football, a dead ball is a condition that occurs between plays. Due to rule differences between leagues, the specific conditions which trigger a dead ball vary slightly, however in general a dead ball typically occurs after any of the following events:

- The player with the ball runs out of bounds.
- The player with the ball is declared down, either by being tackled, kneeling, or sliding.
- Forward progress of the player with the ball is stopped by the defense.
- A forward pass touches the ground or travels out of bounds without being caught (also known as an incomplete pass).
- The ball is fumbled and goes out of bounds.
- A kick travels out of bounds or hits the goal post or crossbar in flight.
- A punt or kickoff enters the endzone without being touched (known as a touchback).
- A punt or kickoff is fair caught by the receiving team.
- A punt is downed by the kicking team before being touched by the receiving team.
- The helmet comes off of the player with the ball for any reason.
- Any scoring play (touchdown, field goal, or safety) occurs. In Canadian football this also includes the single.
- An official otherwise whistles the ball dead, even if inadvertently.

Depending on the league, there may be additional situations which trigger a dead ball. For example, in the CFL, the ball becomes dead if it makes contact with an official, while under NCAA rules, it does not.

During the time in which the ball is dead, the offensive team may not attempt to advance it. The ball remains dead until it is snapped to begin the next play. The clock may or may not be stopped during this time, depending on the specific conditions triggering the dead ball.

Various rule changes over time have altered when a ball may become dead. For example, in the NFL, the ball used to become dead if it came into the possession of the defense for any reason during a try after a touchdown. This rule was changed before the 2015 season, allowing the ball to remain live so that the defense could attempt to return it for a defensive two-point conversion.

=== Rugby league ===
Each end of a rugby league field has a dead ball line; when the ball (or player in possession) crosses or touches this line, the ball is said to have gone dead. This results in a goal line drop out if the defending team had caused the ball to go dead; otherwise, a 20-metre restart ensues.

== Pickleball ==
A dead ball is declared in the game of pickleball when any of the following occur; one of the players commits a fault, the ball hits a permanent object, or a hinder is declared. When a player commits a fault, the other side wins the point. If the ball strikes a permanent object, such as the net post, a referee, or fence, the ball is declared dead, but the point is awarded based on whether or not the ball bounced on the opposing side before hitting the permanent object. If the ball does not bounce on the opposing side's court before hitting the permanent object, the opposing side wins the point. If the ball bounces on the opposing side's court prior to hitting the permanent object, the side that last hit the ball wins the point. If a hindrance results in a dead ball, such as when a person, errant ball or other object enters the court, the serve is restarted with no penalty to either side.

== See also ==
- Bouncing ball
- Cricket terminology
- Dead-ball era (Baseball)
- Glossary of American football
- Glossary of association football terms
- Place kick
- Set piece (football)
