= Ground rule double =

Baseball rule that awards two bases due to the ball leaving play

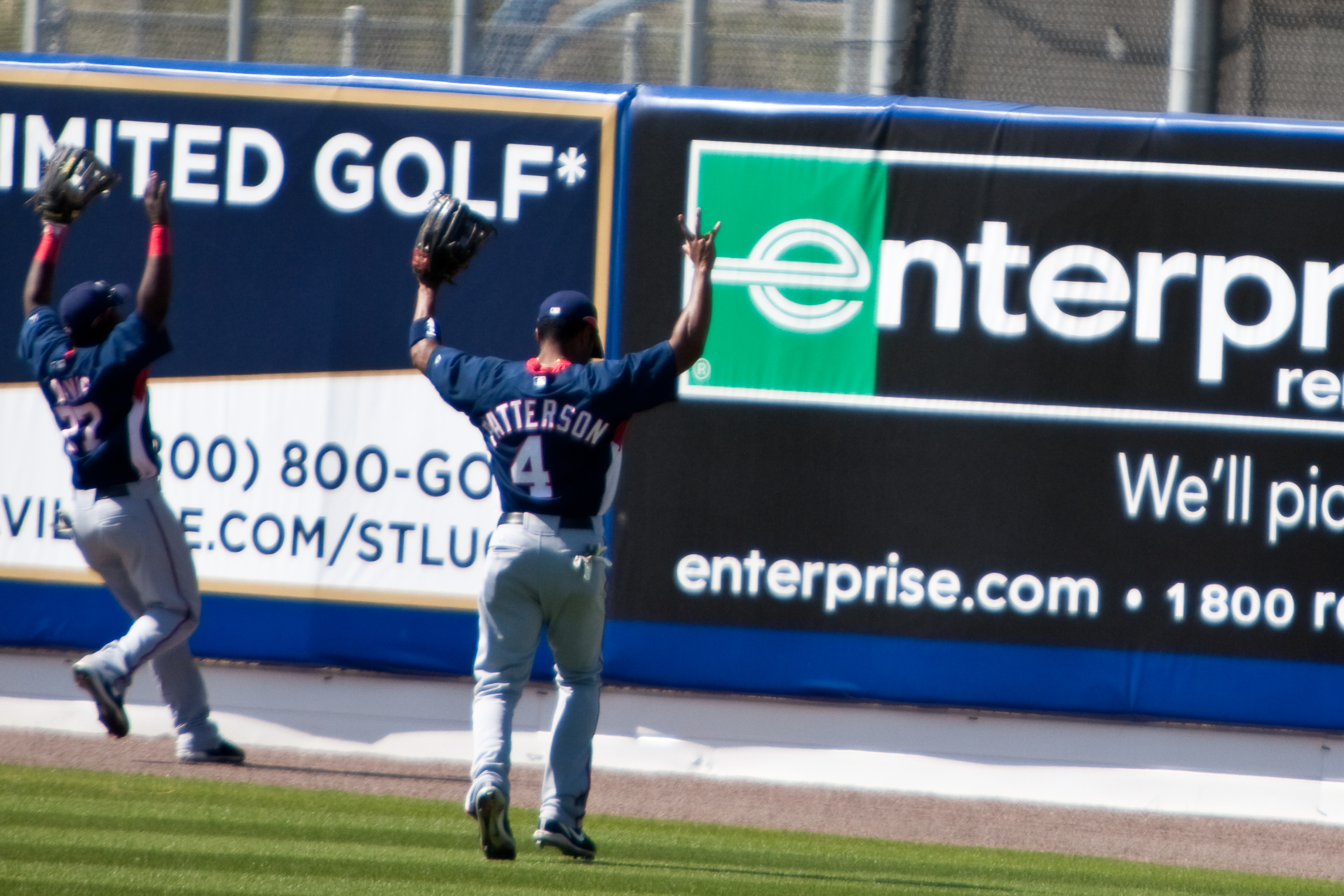
Outfielders raising their arms, due to the baseball going under or becoming stuck in the fence, resulting in a ground rule double.

A ground rule double is a baseball rule that awards two bases from the time of pitch to all baserunners including the batter-runner, as a result of the ball leaving play after being hit fairly and leaving the field under a condition of the ground rules in effect at the field where the game is being played. An automatic double is the term used to refer to a fairly hit ball leaving the field in circumstances that do not merit a home run, such as when the ball's first bounce was within the field. The automatic double (or rule-book double) is commonly called a ground rule double.

== Application ==
Major League Baseball (MLB) has a set of universal ground rules that apply at all ballparks, two of which award two bases to the batter and any baserunners:

- A batted ball lodged in the roof above fair territory (unless outlined otherwise in the home park ground rules)
- Any batted ball in fair territory that, in flight, strikes the facing of a lower wall and then bounds over a higher wall

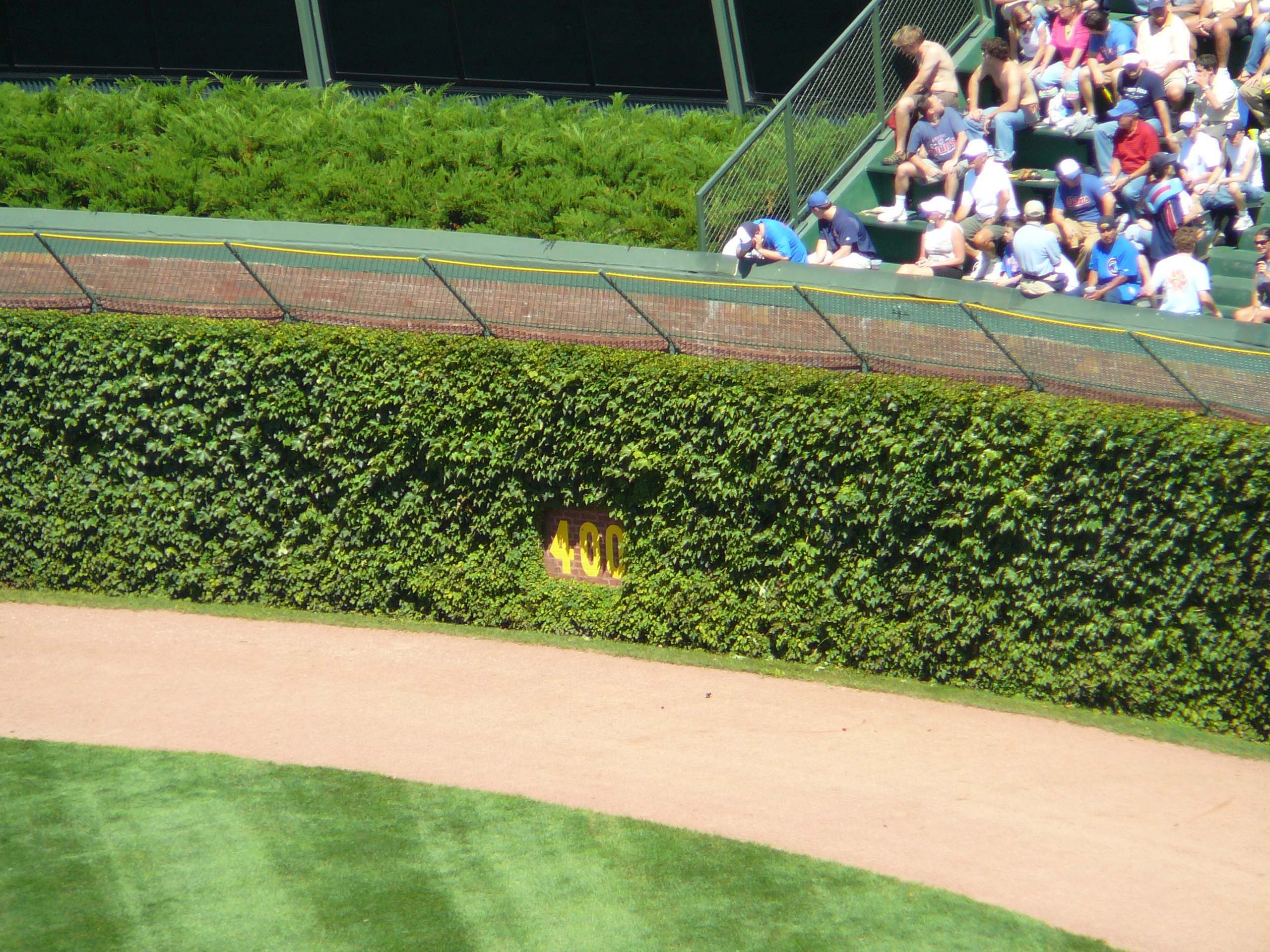
Batted balls lodged in the Wrigley Field ivy are ground rule doubles.

Two bases can also be awarded per home park ground rules—rules created to provide for unique playing conditions of a specific ballpark. For example, ground rules govern the situation when a batted ball is lodged in the ivy at Wrigley Field, or the walkways near the ceiling of Tropicana Field, a domed stadium.

The far more commonly occurring automatic double results from the generally applicable MLB rules 5.05(a)(6) through 5.05(a)(9). These rules govern how to treat the batter (and any runners on base) when a batted ball is hit fair but passes out of the field of play or becomes artificially obstructed while in the field of play. For example, these rules cover balls that hit the ground in fair territory and land out of play, typically by bouncing over a fence or wall in the outfield. The rules also provide generically for the award of a double when a batted ball goes through or under a fence; and when it goes through or sticks in shrubbery or vines on the fence.

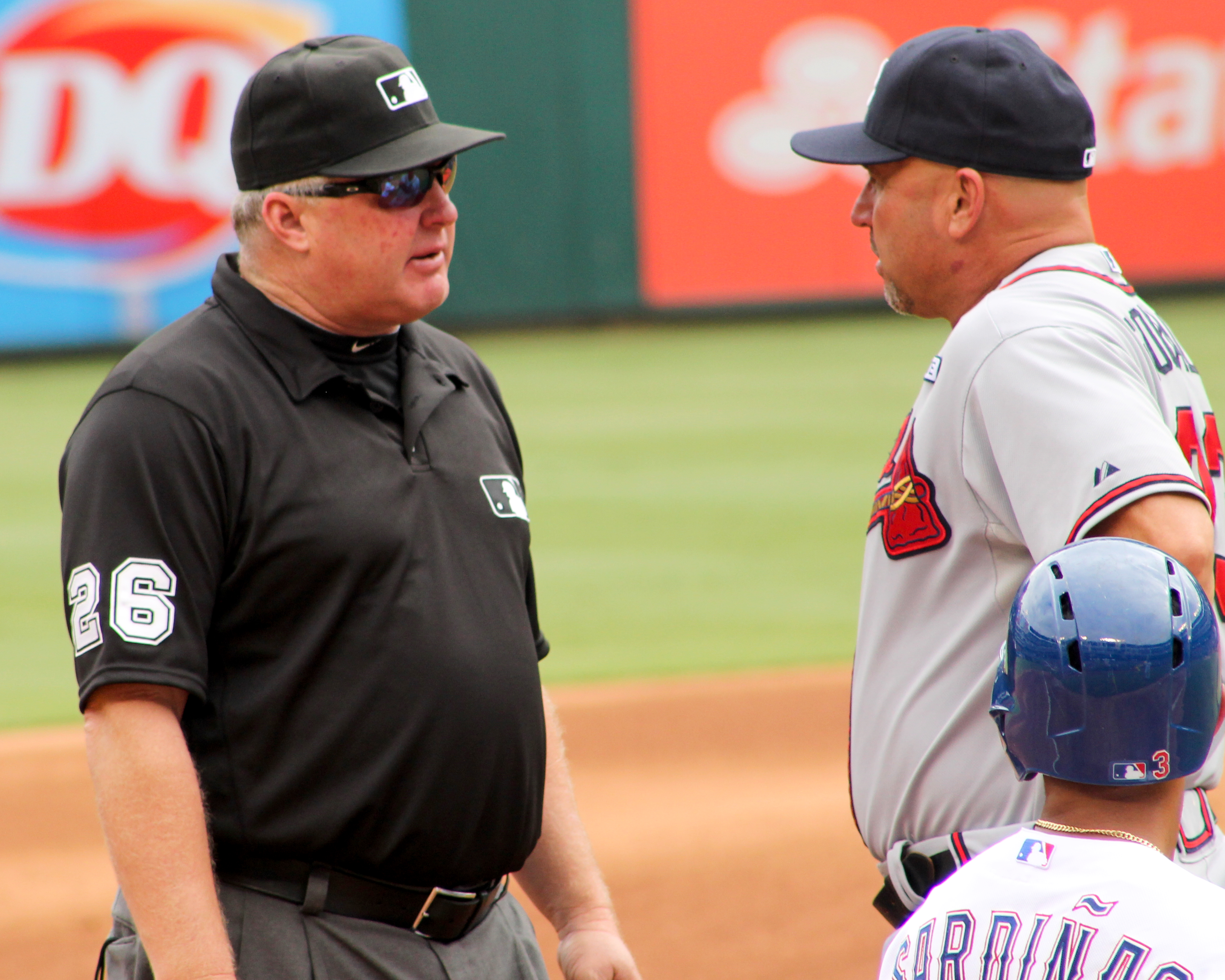
Runners advance two bases from their location at the time of pitch on a ground rule double; umpires can only award more than two bases in certain instances of interference.

MLB rule 5.05(a)(9) governs when fair fly balls are deflected into the stands by a fielder: "The batter becomes a runner when... Any fair fly ball is deflected by the fielder into the stands, or over the fence into foul territory, in which case the batter shall be entitled to advance to second base; but if deflected into the stands or over the fence in fair territory, the batter shall be entitled to a home run. However, should such a fair fly be deflected at a point less than 250 feet (76 m) from home plate, the batter shall be entitled to two bases only."

When two bases are awarded by either ground rules or the automatic rule, any baserunners ahead of the batter are entitled to advance two bases from their positions at the time of pitch. Only in the case of interference is the umpire vested with discretion to award more bases (see MLB rule 6.01). Application of the ground rule or automatic double rule can result in a runner at first base, who appears to have been able to score on a batted ball, being required to return to third base due to the ball going out of play.

== History ==
In the early years of baseball, batted balls that cleared the fence in fair territory on the fly or after a bounce were counted as home runs. The rule was changed by the American League before the 1929 season and by the National League before the 1931 season. Baseball records did not differentiate between home runs that cleared the fence on the fly and those that bounced over. Notably, this includes most of Babe Ruth's career, including when he hit 60 home runs in 1927, although there is no evidence any of Ruth’s home runs bounced before going over the fence. The last "bounce" home run in MLB was hit by Babe Herman of the Brooklyn Robins on September 23, 1930, at Ebbets Field.

== See also ==
- Four (cricket)
