= Hit (baseball) =

When a batter safely reaches base

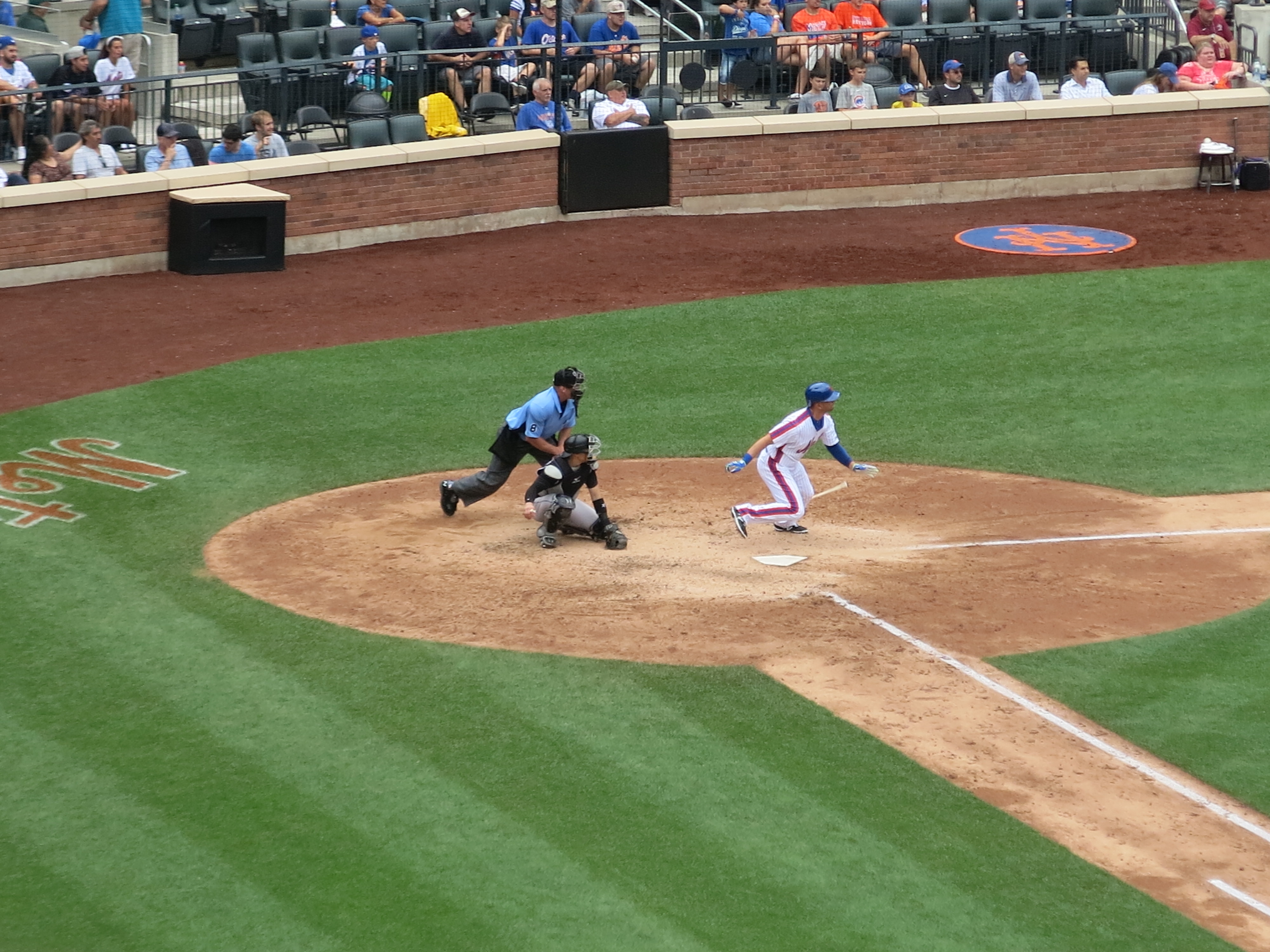
A batter starts his run to reach first base after successfully hitting the ball.

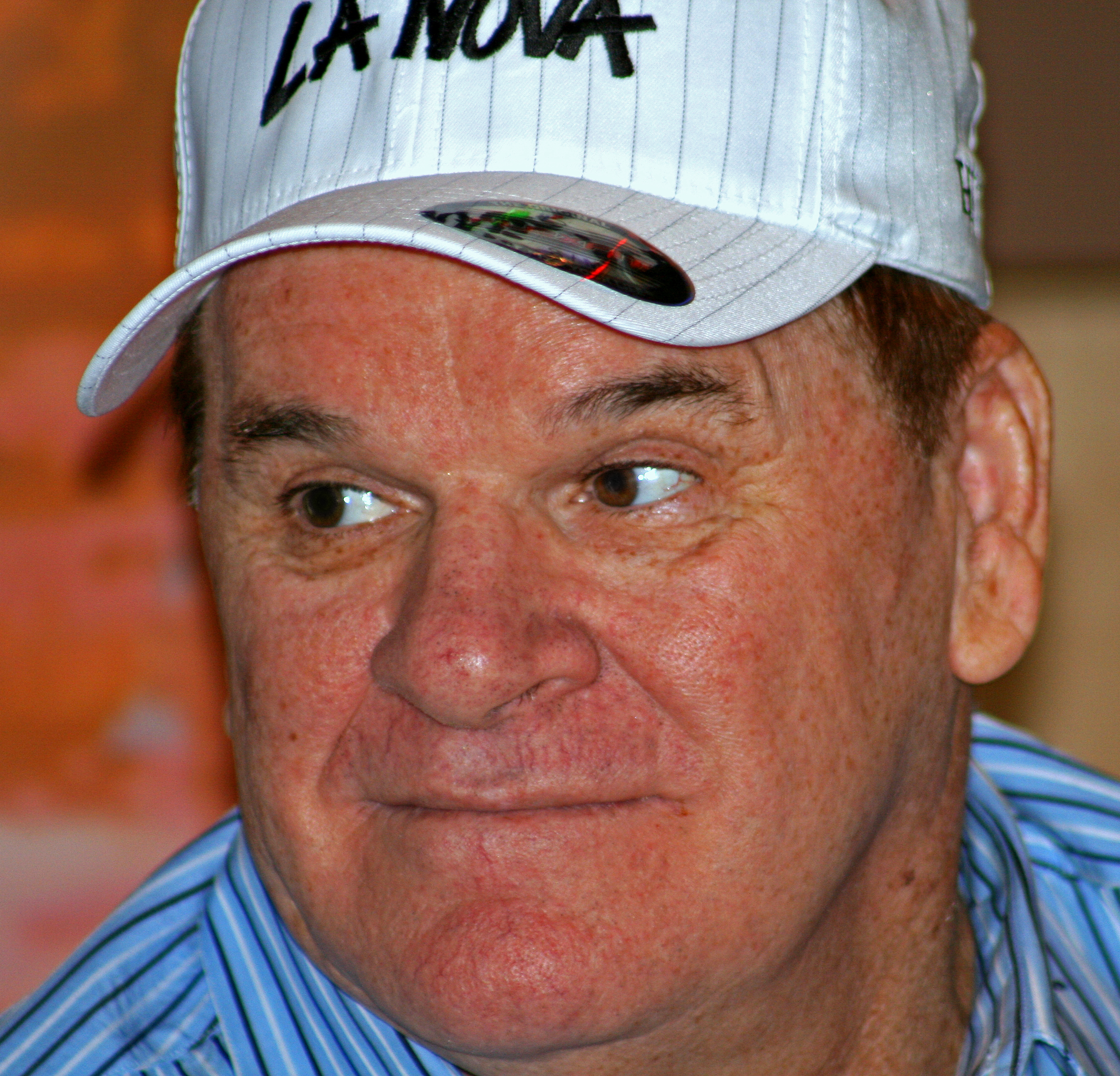
Pete Rose is the all-time leader in Major League Baseball hits, recording 4,256.

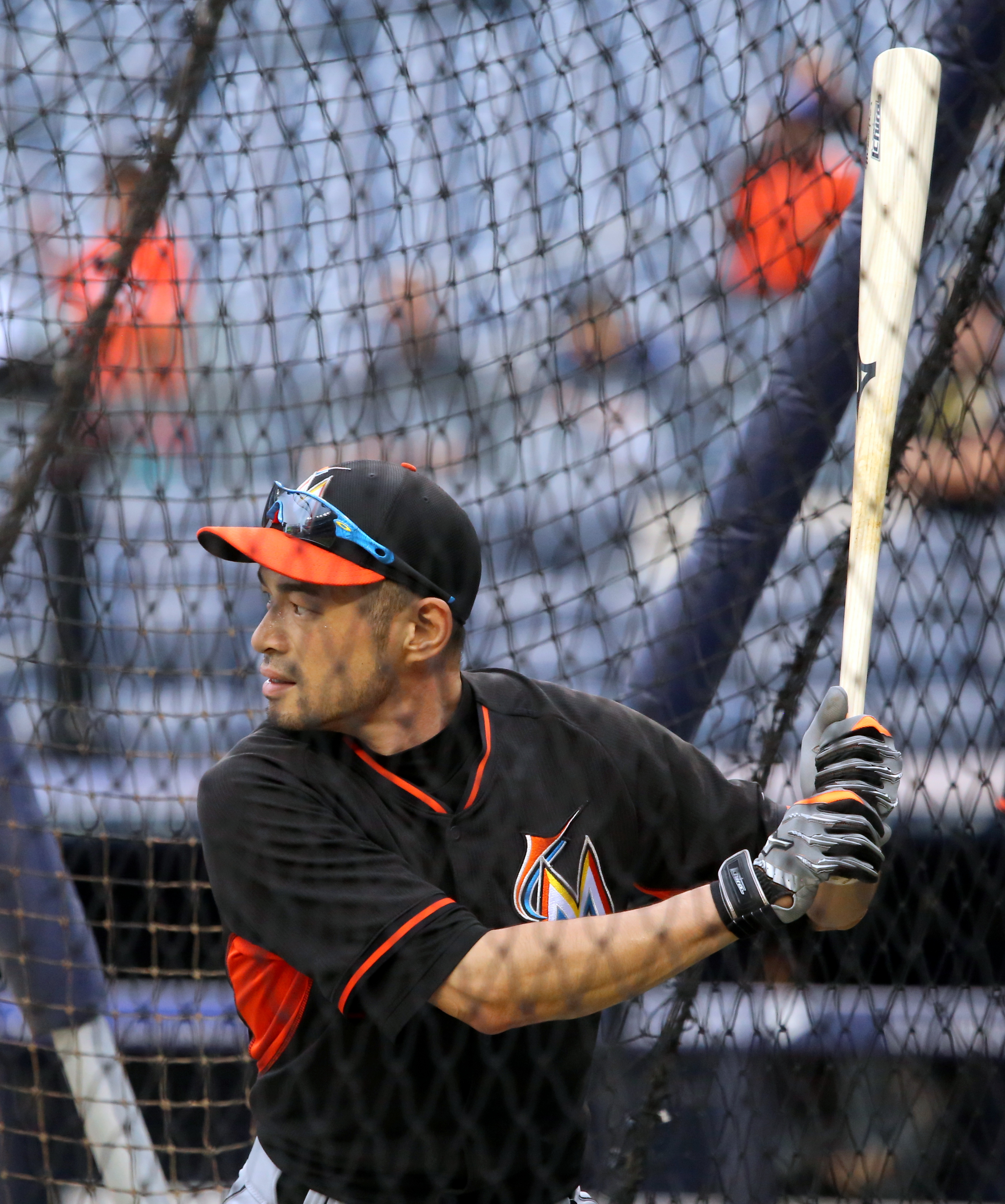
Ichiro Suzuki has recorded the most career hits across top tier professional leagues, 4,367, combining his 3,089 Major League hits with his previous 1,278 hits in Nippon Professional Baseball.

In baseball statistics, a hit (denoted by H), also called a base hit, is credited to a batter when the batter safely reaches or passes first base after hitting the ball into fair territory with neither the benefit of an error nor a fielder's choice.

== Scoring a hit ==
To achieve a hit, the batter must reach first base before any fielder can either tag him with the ball, throw to another player protecting the base before the batter reaches it, or tag first base while carrying the ball. The hit is scored the moment the batter reaches first base safely; if he is put out while attempting to stretch his hit to a double or triple or home run on the same play, he still gets credit for a hit (according to the last base he reached safely on the play).

If a batter reaches first base because of offensive interference by a preceding runner (including if a preceding runner is hit by a batted ball), he is also credited with a hit.

=== Types of hits ===
A hit for one base is called a single, for two bases a double, and for three bases a triple. A home run is also scored as a hit. Doubles, triples, and home runs are also called extra base hits.

An "infield hit" is a hit where the ball does not leave the infield. Infield hits are uncommon by nature, and most often earned by speedy runners.

== Pitching a no-hitter ==
A no-hitter is a game in which one of the teams prevented the other from getting a hit. Throwing a no-hitter is rare and considered an extraordinary accomplishment for a pitcher or pitching staff. In most cases in the professional game, no-hitters are accomplished by a single pitcher who throws a complete game. A pitcher who throws a no-hitter could still allow runners to reach base safely, by way of walks, errors, hit batsmen, or batter reaching base due to interference or obstruction. If the pitcher allows no runners to reach base in any manner whatsoever (hit, walk, hit batsman, error, etc.), the no-hitter is a perfect game.

== 1887 discrepancy ==
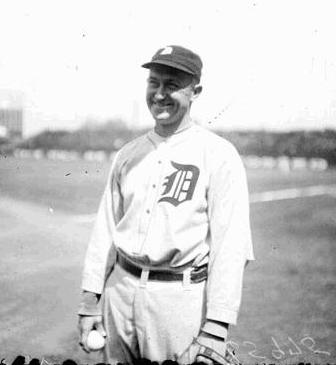
Ty Cobb recorded a career 4,191 hits, holding the Major League record for 57 years.

In 1887, Major League Baseball counted bases on balls (walks) as hits. The result was skyrocketing batting averages, including some near .500; Tip O'Neill of the St. Louis Browns batted .485 that season, which would still be a major league record if recognized. The experiment was abandoned the following season.

There is controversy regarding how the records of 1887 should be interpreted. The number of legitimate walks and at-bats are known for all players that year, so computing averages using the same method as in other years is straightforward. In 1968, Major League Baseball formed a Special Baseball Records Committee to resolve this (and other) issues. The Committee ruled that walks in 1887 should not be counted as hits. In 2000, Major League Baseball reversed its decision, ruling that the statistics which were recognized in each year's official records should stand, even in cases where they were later proven incorrect. Most current sources list O'Neill's 1887 average as .435, as calculated by omitting his walks. He would retain his American Association batting championship. However, the variance between methods results in differing recognition for the 1887 National League batting champion. Cap Anson would be recognized, with his .421 average, if walks are included, but Sam Thompson would be the champion at .372 if they are not.

== Major League Baseball rules ==
The official rulebook of Major League Baseball states in Rule 10.05:

(a) The official scorer shall credit a batter with a base hit when:

(1) the batter reaches first base (or any succeeding base) safely on a fair ball that settles on the ground, that touches a fence before being touched by a fielder or that clears a fence;
(2) the batter reaches first base safely on a fair ball hit with such force, or so slowly, that any fielder attempting to make a play with the ball has no opportunity to do so;

Rule 10.05(a)(2) Comment: The official scorer shall credit a hit if the fielder attempting to handle the ball cannot make a play, even if such fielder deflects the ball from or cuts off another fielder who could have put out a runner.

(3) the batter reaches first base safely on a fair ball that takes an unnatural bounce so that a fielder cannot handle it with ordinary effort, or that touches the pitcher's plate or any base (including home plate) before being touched by a fielder and bounces so that a fielder cannot handle the ball with ordinary effort;
(4) the batter reaches first base safely on a fair ball that has not been touched by a fielder and that is in fair territory when the ball reaches the outfield, unless in the scorer's judgment the ball could have been handled with ordinary effort;
(5) a fair ball that has not been touched by a fielder touches a runner or an umpire, unless a runner is called out for having been touched by an Infield Fly, in which case the official scorer shall not score a hit; or
(6) a fielder unsuccessfully attempts to put out a preceding runner and, in the official scorer's judgment, the batter-runner would not have been put out at first base by ordinary effort.

Rule 10.05(a) Comment: In applying Rule 10.05(a), the official scorer shall always give the batter the benefit of the doubt. A safe course for the official scorer to follow is to score a hit when exceptionally good fielding of a ball fails to result in a putout.

(b) The official scorer shall not credit a base hit when a:

(1) runner is forced out by a batted ball, or would have been forced out except for a fielding error;
(2) batter apparently hits safely and a runner who is forced to advance by reason of the batter becoming a runner fails to touch the first base to which such runner is advancing and is called out on appeal. The official scorer shall charge the batter with an at-bat but not a hit;
(3) pitcher, the catcher or any infielder handles a batted ball and puts out a preceding runner who is attempting to advance one base or to return to his original base, or would have put out such runner with ordinary effort except for a fielding error. The official scorer shall charge the batter with an at-bat but not a hit;
(4) fielder fails in an attempt to put out a preceding runner and, in the scorer's judgment, the batter-runner could have been put out at first base; or

Rule 10.05(b) Comment: Rule 10.05(b) shall not apply if the fielder merely looks toward or feints toward another base before attempting to make the putout at first base.

(5) runner is called out for interference with a fielder attempting to field a batted ball, unless in the scorer's judgment the batter-runner would have been safe had the interference not occurred.

== See also ==
- List of Major League Baseball hit records
- List of Major League Baseball progressive career hits leaders
- List of Nippon Professional Baseball career hits leaders
- List of KBO Career Hits leaders
- List of Major League Baseball career hits leaders
- 3,000 hit club
