= Chandler Redmond =

American baseball player (born 1997)

Free agent
- First baseman
- Born: January 9, 1997 (age 29); Middletown, Maryland, U.S.
- Bats: Left Throws: Right

Chandler Brooks Redmond (born January 9, 1997) is an American professional baseball first baseman.

== Amateur career ==
Redmond attended Georgetown Preparatory School, a Jesuit college-preparatory school in North Bethesda, Maryland. Redmond committed to play college baseball at Gardner–Webb University. In his four-year career, Redmond batted .267 with 50 home runs and 153 runs batted in (RBI) in 199 games. In 2018, he was named a member of the all-Big South Conference team as a designated hitter. During his senior season in 2019, Redmond slashed .309/.412/.660. On March 29, 2019, he tallied seven RBIs in a game against the University of South Carolina Upstate.

== Professional career ==
The St. Louis Cardinals selected Redmond in the 32nd round, with the 965th overall pick, of the 2019 Major League Baseball draft. He made his professional debut that same year with the Rookie-level Johnson City Cardinals. Redmond finished the season with a .287 batting average, 12 home runs and 40 RBIs in 54 games played. He was also third in the Appalachian League in slugging percentage at .552 and in on-base plus slugging at .935.

Redmond did not play in a game in 2020 due to the cancellation of the minor league season because of the COVID-19 pandemic. He began the 2021 season with the High-A Peoria Chiefs where he batted .234 with 13 home runs in 64 games. Redmond was promoted the Double-A Springfield Cardinals where he slashed .303/.361/.500 in 32 games.

Redmond began the 2022 season with Springfield. On August 10, 2022, in a game with Springfield, Redmond hit for a “home run cycle” (a solo homer, 2-run homer, 3-run homer, and grand slam). According the Society for American Baseball Research (SABR), a “home run cycle” has only been accomplished once before in organized professional baseball (the other was Tyrone Horne in 1998 for the Double-A Arkansas Travelers). In the game, Redmond was 5-for-6 with four homers and 11 RBI as the Cardinals beat the Amarillo Sod Poodles 21–4. The bat he used to hit the home runs was exhibited at the National Baseball Hall of Fame in Cooperstown, New York. In 2023, Redmond spent the entire season with Springfield where he appeared in 132 games, slashing .256/.375/.503 with 31 home runs and 92 RBI.

He returned to Springfield to the start the 2024 season, marking is fourth season in a row with the team. On July 13, 2024, Redmond hit his 60th career home run with the Springfield Cardinals, a new franchise record. In 103 appearances split between Springfield and the Triple-A Memphis Redbirds, he batted a combined .225/.320/.354 with 11 home runs and 56 RBI. Redmond was released by the Cardinals organization on March 19, 2025.

== Personal life ==
Redmond and his wife Kristan were married in 2021.
