= Foul ball =

In baseball, generally, a struck ball that ends up in foul territory

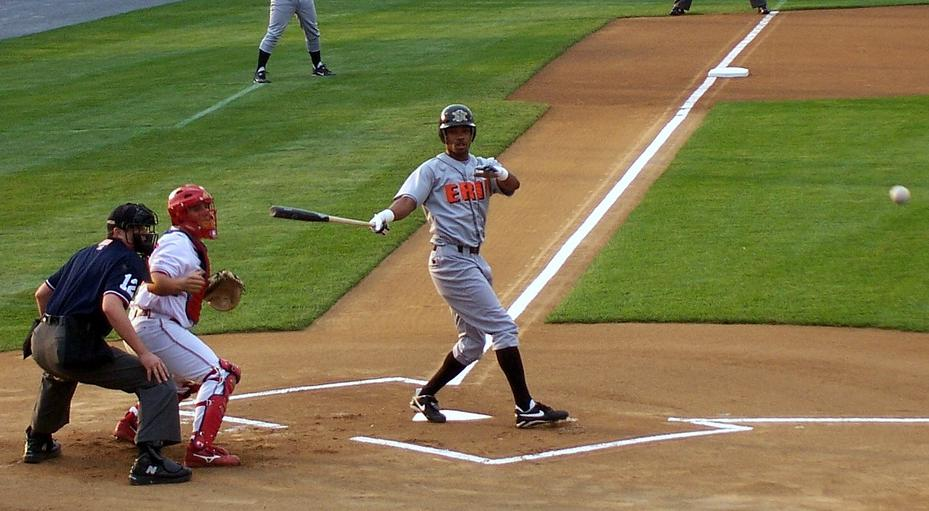
Nook Logan, of the Erie SeaWolves, hitting a foul ball during a game against the Reading Phillies on July 2, 2006.

In baseball, a foul ball is a batted ball that:

- Settles on foul territory between home and first base or between home and third base, or
- Bounces and then goes past first or third base on or over foul territory, or
- Has its first bounce occur in foul territory beyond first or third base, or
- Touches an umpire or player, or any object foreign to the natural ground, while on or over foul territory. By interpretation, a batted ball that touches a batter while in his batter's box is foul regardless of whether it is over foul territory.

The entirety of the batted ball must be on or over foul territory in order to be adjudged foul in the above situations; otherwise it is a fair ball that forces the batter to attempt to reach first base.

A foul fly shall be judged according to the relative position of the ball and the foul line, including the foul pole, and not as to whether the fielder is on foul or fair territory at the time he touches the ball. If the foul ball gets caught, then it would be judged as an out.

Additionally, ballpark ground rules may specify that batted balls striking certain fixed objects such as railings, nets, or a roof if present are foul balls.

== Overview ==
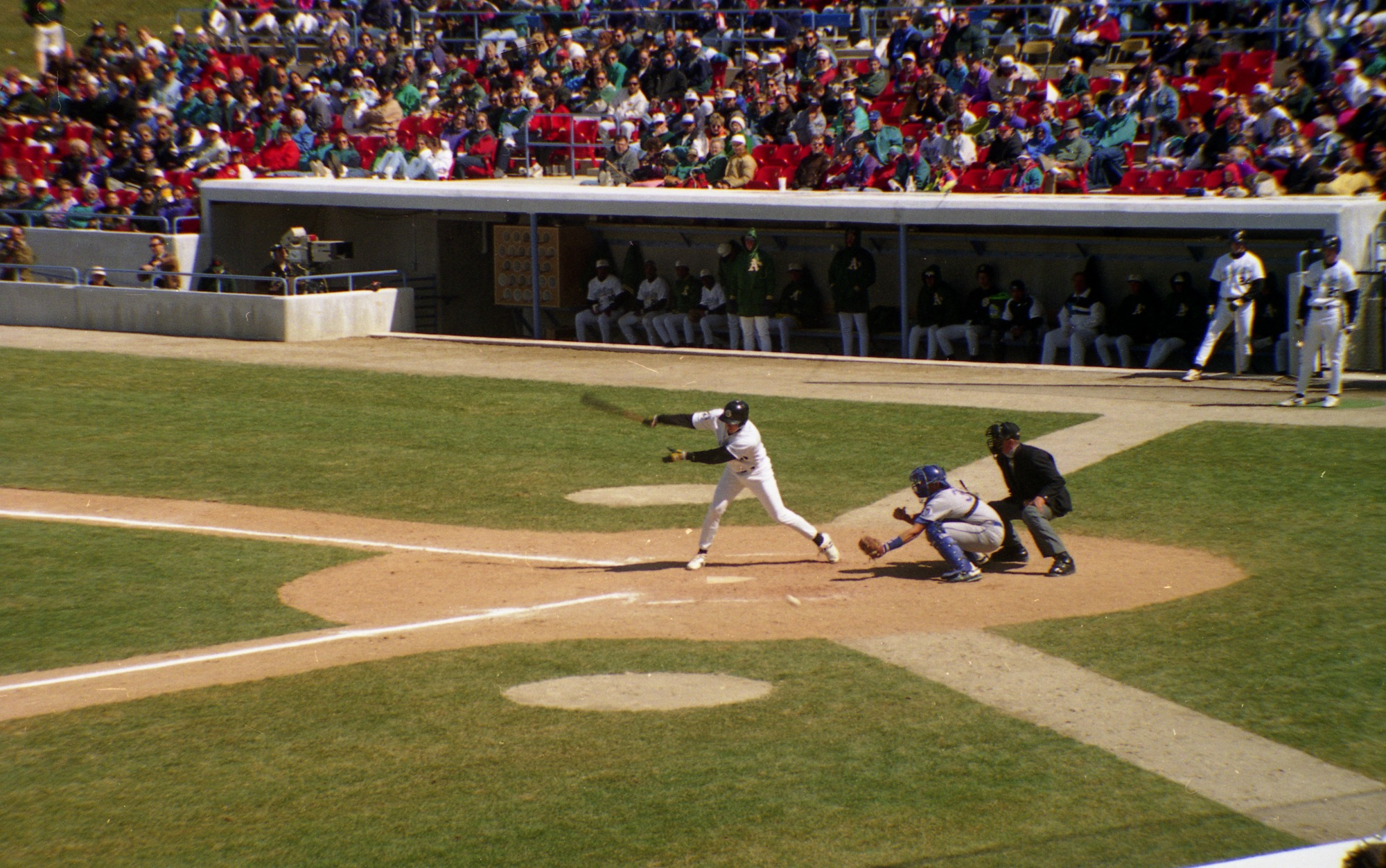
The batter and catcher are the only players that are generally stationed in foul territory, with the home plate umpire nearby to call balls and strikes.

Foul territory or foul ground is defined as that part of the playing field outside the first and third base lines extended to the fence and perpendicularly upwards. Note: the foul lines and foul poles are not part of foul territory.

In general, when a batted ball is ruled a foul ball, the ball is dead, all runners must return to their time-of-pitch base without liability to be put out, and the batter returns to home plate to continue his turn at bat. A strike is issued for the batter if he had fewer than two strikes. If the batter already has two strikes against him when he hits a foul ball, a strike is not issued unless the ball was bunted to become a foul ball, in which case a third strike is issued and a strikeout recorded for the batter and pitcher. A strike is, however, recorded for the pitcher for every foul ball the batter hits, regardless of the count. If any member of the fielding team catches a foul ball before it touches the ground or lands outside the field perimeter, the batter is out. However, the caught ball is in play and base runners may attempt to advance.

A foul ball is different from a foul tip, in which the ball makes contact with the bat, travels directly to the catcher's hands, and is caught. In this case, the ball remains live and a strike is added to the batter's count. A batter who hits a foul tip with two strikes on the count is out.

To aid umpires in determining whether balls hit over the fence are fair or foul, a tall foul pole is often erected at each corner of the outfield. A batted ball which hits the foul pole above the fence is never a foul ball, no matter where it is ultimately deflected off the pole, in this case a home run is automatically awarded to the batter.

In kickball, foul ball does not make a strike, but three foul balls make an out.

== History ==
=== Origin ===
The concept of foul territory was not always present in historical versions of baseball. John Thorn, the Official Baseball Historian for Major League Baseball, speculates that the concept may have originated from single wicket cricket, with its rule of halving the area that the ball could be hit in when there were less than five fielders. The 1845 Knickerbocker Rules, which laid the foundation for modern baseball, also included the concept of foul territory due to a need to adapt the game when there not enough players; according to Thorn, even home runs were potentially considered foul in this set of rules, since losing the club's only ball in the nearby Hudson River would prematurely end the game.

Originally, any ball that landed in fair territory was called fair, even if it went foul before leaving the infield. These "fair fouls" led to first and third basemen being forced to play closer to the foul lines, leading to calls for ten-person baseball teams. Fair fouls were amended out of the game before the 20th century.

=== Modern history ===
Until the 1920s, Major League Baseball spectators were often ejected if they attempted to keep foul balls, and teams employed security guards to ensure it. Factors such as negative public sentiment, a decrease in the cost of baseballs relative to team revenues and increased pressure to discontinue use of worn, damaged and/or discolored baseballs (especially after the death of Ray Chapman) combined to persuade several teams to change their foul ball policies during this period; the New York Giants changed theirs after losing a New York Supreme Court case (Reuben Berman vs. National Exhibition Co.) filed by Reuben Berman. Berman, a businessman, was ejected in 1921 after tossing a foul ball he caught into the stands.

== Strategies ==
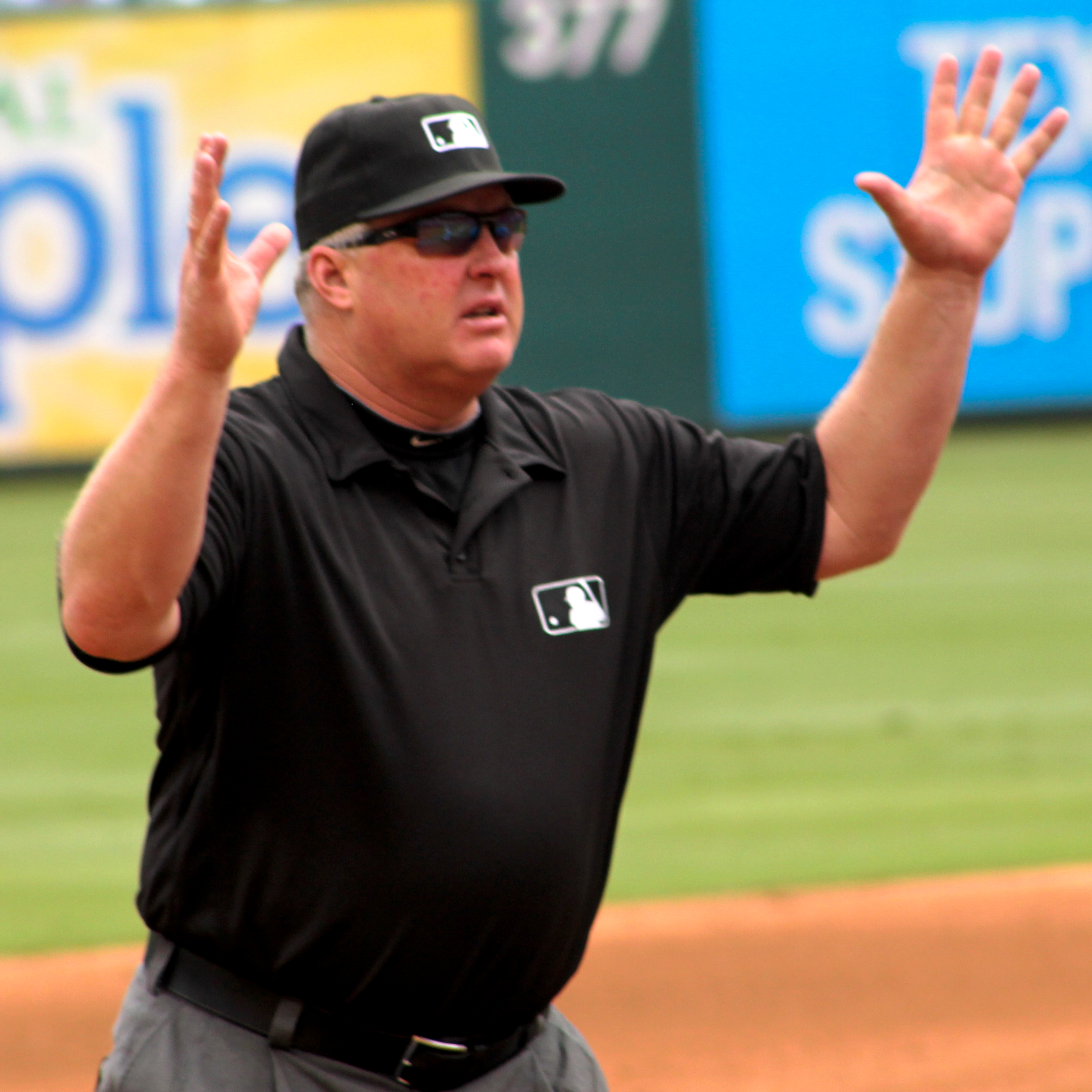
Umpire Bill Miller gives the hand signal for a foul ball

Depending on the exact situation, a foul ball may be considered beneficial to the offense or the defense.

When there are zero or one strikes, a foul ball counts as a strike, benefiting the pitcher. However, a foul ball may reveal to the batter that he has timed a pitch well and need only make adjustment to the location of his swing on the next such pitch; this is often called a good cut or simply a good swing. Foul balls with two strikes are generally considered positive for the batter, since he thus avoids strike three on a potentially difficult pitch. Also, foul balls with two strikes increase the pitcher's pitch count, adding to their fatigue, thus providing some small advantage to the offense.

A strategy of swinging on any ball to try to produce additional fouls and prolong an at-bat is often used against strong pitchers to try to drive them from the game sooner (and also the possibility of the pitcher throwing a pitch a hitter can get a hit on); this does, however, have the disadvantage of generating more strikeouts.

In very specific circumstance—such as in the bottom of the ninth inning (or later) of a tie game when a runner is on third base with less than two outs—outfielders may intentionally not catch deep fly balls in foul territory, as catching such a ball would create a sacrifice fly, potentially allowing the winning run to score.

== See also ==
- Baseball Rule, legal doctrine from 1913 court case that generally prevents spectators from holding teams liable for injuries from foul balls
