= Balk =

Illegal pitcher's move in baseball

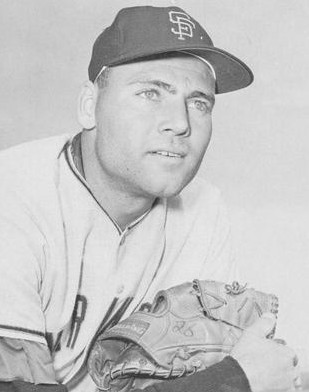
Bob Shaw holds the major league record for most balks in a single game, five, in 1963.

In baseball, a balk is a set of illegal motions or actions that a pitcher may make. Most of these violations involve pitchers pretending to pitch when they have no intention of doing so. In games played under the Official Baseball Rules that govern professional play in the United States and Canada, as well as NCAA rules governing college baseball, a balk results in a dead ball or delayed dead ball. In certain other circumstances, a balk may be wholly or partially disregarded. In the United States, under the National Federation of State High School Associations (NFHS Baseball Rules), a balk results in an immediate dead ball. In the event a balk is enforced, the pitch is generally (but not always) nullified, each runner is awarded one base, and the batter (generally) remains at bat with the previous count. The balk rule in Major League Baseball was introduced in 1898.

According to the Official Baseball Rules: "Umpires should bear in mind that the purpose of the balk rule is to prevent the pitcher from deliberately deceiving the base runner."

== Balk actions ==
A pitcher is restricted to a certain set of motions and one of two basic pitching positions before and during a pitch. If these regulations are violated with one or more runners on base, an umpire may call a balk. The batter at home plate does not advance on a balk.

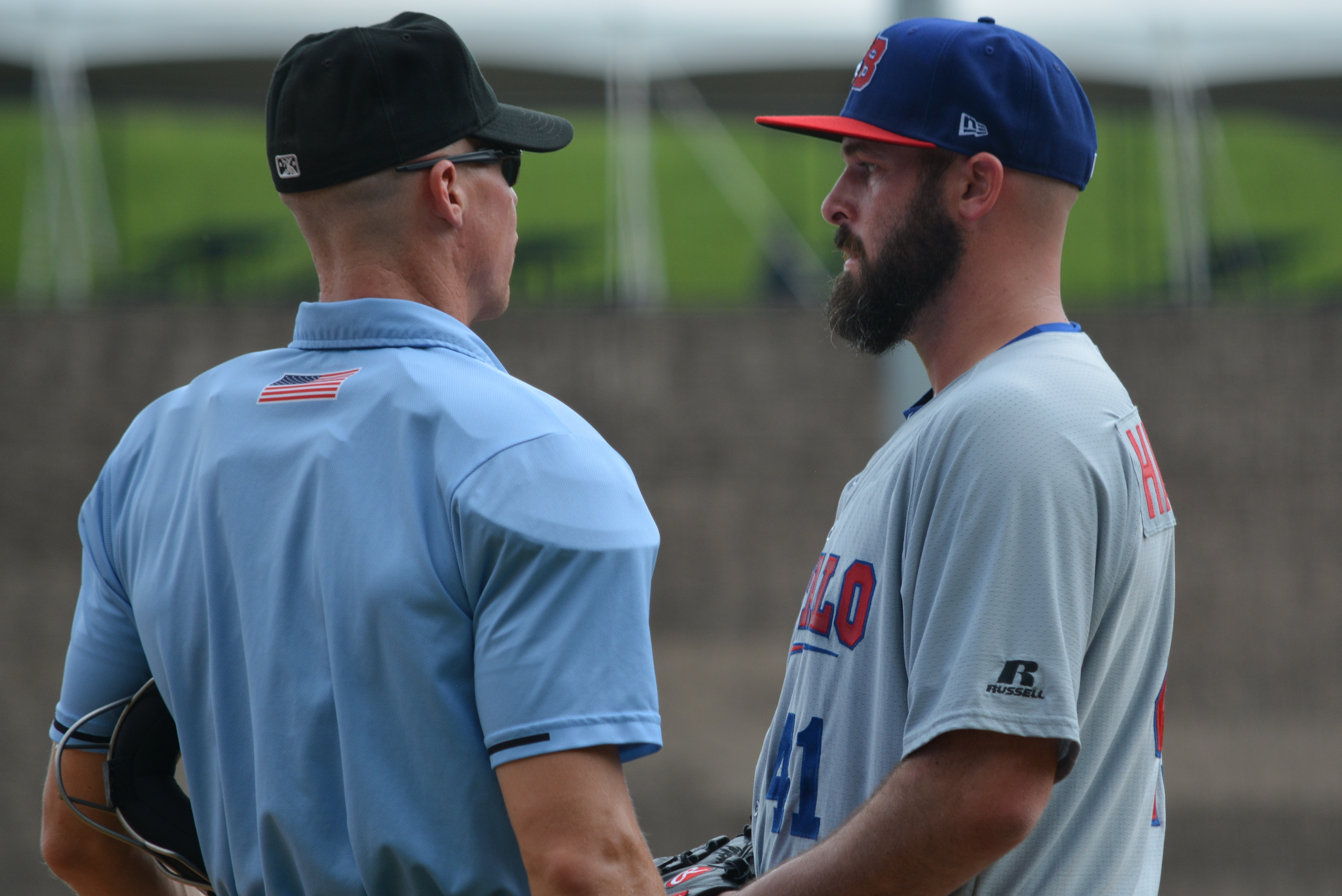
Mike Hauschild (right) talks to an umpire after having been called for a balk

With a runner on base and the pitcher on or astride (with one leg on each side of) the rubber, under the Official Baseball Rules of Major League Baseball (MLB), it is a balk when the pitcher:

- Switches pitching position from the windup to the set (or vice versa) without properly disengaging the rubber.
- While on the rubber, makes a motion associated with a pitch and does not complete the delivery.
- When pitching from the set position, fails to make a complete stop with his hands together before beginning to pitch.
- Throws from the mound to a base without stepping toward (gaining distance in the direction of that base).
- Throws or feints a throw from the rubber to an unoccupied base, unless a play is imminent.
- Steps or feints from the rubber to first or third base without completing the throw.
- Delivers a quick return, a pitch thrown right after receiving the ball back, with intent to catch the batter off-guard.
- Drops the ball while on the rubber, even if by accident, if the ball does not subsequently cross a foul line.
- Unnecessarily delays the game.
- Pitches while facing away from the batter.
- After bringing his hands together on the rubber, separates them except in making a pitch or a throw.
- Stands on or astride the rubber without the ball, or mimics a pitch without the ball.
- Attempts to throw to a fielder in a spot not directly at a base.
- Delivers a pitch during a squeeze play or a steal of home, if the catcher or some other player steps on or in front of home plate without possession of the ball, or touches the batter (or the bat). The ball is dead, the batter is awarded first base, the pitcher is charged with a balk, and the run scores.

With the addition of new pace-of-play rules introduced for the 2023 season, a pitcher is charged with a balk if he attempts a pickoff more than twice in a single at-bat without recording an out, and without the runner advancing.

Under National Federation of State High School Associations (NFHS) rules, a balk occurs when:

- There is any feinting toward the batter or first base, or any dropping of the ball (even though accidental) and the ball does not cross a foul line.
- The pitcher fails to step with the non-pivot foot directly toward a base (occupied or unoccupied) when throwing or feinting there in an attempt to put out, or drive back a runner; or throwing or feinting to any unoccupied base when it is not an attempt to put out or drive back a runner.
- An illegal pitch from any position.
- Failing to pitch to the batter in a continuous motion immediately after any movement of any part of the body such as he habitually uses in his delivery.
- Taking a hand off the ball while in a set position (unless he pitches to the batter or throws toward a base or he steps toward and feints a throw to second or third base).
- Failing to pitch to the batter when the entire non-pivot foot passes behind the perpendicular plane of the back edge of the pitcher’s plate, except when feinting or throwing to second base in an attempt to put out a runner.
- The pitcher makes a movement naturally associated with pitching and/or places his feet on the pitcher's plate without the ball.

The pitcher's acts of spitting on the ball, defacing or altering the ball, rubbing the ball on the clothing or body, or applying a foreign substance to the ball are not balks; however, it will result in the pitcher's ejection from the game if caught.

== Clarifications ==
If no runners are on base and the pitcher commits an otherwise balkable action, there generally is no penalty. However, delivering a quick return or pitching while off the rubber (which constitute balks when runners are on base) results in a ball being called with the bases empty. If the pitcher commits an act confusing to the batter with nobody on, stops their delivery, or otherwise violates, play is restarted without penalty and time is called. If a pitcher repeatedly commits illegal actions without runners on base, they may be subject to ejection for persistently violating the rules.

In Major League Baseball, a pitcher was allowed to feint toward third (or second) base, and then turn and throw or feint to first base if the pitcher's pivot foot disengaged the rubber after the initial feint. This is called the "fake to third, throw to first" play. However, this has been considered a balk since the 2013 season.

If, during an attempt to execute the "hidden ball trick" (where the defensive team deceives the runner(s) as to the ball's location while the play is live), the pitcher stands on or astride the rubber prior to the fielder revealing the ball and applying the tag, the runner is not out. Instead, it is a balk, with all runners on base being awarded their next base.

The Official Baseball Rules contemplate outcomes where, despite a balk, the batter puts the ball into play. This is covered within the definition of the penalty for a balk (italics added): "PENALTY: The ball is dead, and each runner shall advance one base without liability to be put out, unless the batter reaches first on a hit, an error, a base on balls, a hit batter, or otherwise and all other runners advance at least one base, in which case the play proceeds without reference to the balk." This was added in 1955, and allows, for example, a home run hit on a pitch judged to be a balk to remain a home run. Joe Garagiola once spoke about an incident that spurred that rule change; with the St. Louis Cardinals hosting the New York Giants on August 6, 1949, Cardinal first baseman Nippy Jones hit a home run that was nullified because the umpire called a balk on Giant pitcher Adrián Zabala. Additionally, the Rules note that, "In cases where a pitcher balks and throws wild, either to a base or to home plate, a runner or runners may advance beyond the base to which he is entitled at his own risk."

== Common misconceptions ==
"Catcher's balk" is not a term in the official rules, but is sometimes used to describe an atypical situation relating to an intentional walk: if the catcher is not completely within the catcher's box when the pitcher releases the ball during delivery, it is a violation. The balk is still charged to the pitcher, because such a pitch is defined as a "Pitcher Illegal Action."

A pitcher is not required to step off the rubber before throwing to an occupied base in a pick-off attempt. With his pivot foot in contact with the rubber in either the windup position or the "set" position, the pitcher may either: 1) deliver the ball to the batter: 2) throw to a base for a pickoff; or 3) step off the rubber.

MLB rules state that: "Pitchers shall take signs from the catcher while in contact with the pitcher’s plate" (the rubber), but the rules do not describe the infraction of not doing so as a balk.

== Major League Baseball balk records ==
Steve Carlton had 90 balks during his major-league career, the most by any pitcher. The single-season major-league record is held by Dave Stewart, who had 16 balks in 1988 while pitching for the Oakland Athletics.

The major-league record for the most balks in one game is held by Bob Shaw, who had five balks on May 4, 1963, pitching for the Milwaukee Braves against the Chicago Cubs. Four of the five balks came when Billy Williams was on base: one in the first inning, then three more in the third inning. In the latter frame, Shaw walked Williams and then proceeded to balk him to second, third, and home. Shaw's balks were blamed on his difficulty adjusting to a then-new point of emphasis in the rules: National League umpires were told to strictly enforce the section of the balk rule that required the pitcher, when going from the stretch to the set position, to come to a complete stop with his hands together for one full second before pitching. The rule had been virtually ignored before. At least seven pitchers have committed four balks in a major-league game.

Knuckleballer Charlie Hough was once called for nine balks in one major-league exhibition game, occurring in March 1988. He was called for seven balks in a single inning of the game, as umpires set out to "enforce a full set position" for the coming season.

On September 27, 2022, Miami Marlins reliever Richard Bleier was called for three balks in a row by first-base umpire John Tumpane, all while facing New York Mets batter Pete Alonso. Bleier had given up a single and was then called for three balks while facing Alonso, balking the runner home. Marlins manager Don Mattingly was ejected for arguing the third balk. After Alonso grounded out for the third out of the inning, Bleier was also ejected for continuing to argue the balks. Until that point, Bleier had never had a balk called against him in his seven-year major-league career, over the course of 303 games. This instance tied the record for most balks in an inning and for most balks in a single at bat. Sports writer Mike Axisa wrote that: "Some balks are obvious. Those are not... You almost have to be looking for a reason to call a balk to ring Bleier up on that motion three – again, three! – times in a single inning."

== Notable balks ==
During the 1947 World Series, New York Yankees pitcher Spec Shea dropped the ball trying to pick off Jackie Robinson of the Brooklyn Dodgers at first base. After at least one other attempt, Shea dropped the ball and umpire Babe Pinelli waved Robinson to second base.

A famous balk came in the first All-Star Game of 1961, when strong winds at Candlestick Park caused pitcher Stu Miller to sway erratically and be called for a balk. This story is often exaggerated in re-tellings of baseball lore, some having Miller being blown off the pitching mound.

The Los Angeles Dodgers defeated the Texas Rangers on June 18, 2015, when Rangers relief pitcher Keone Kela committed a balk in the bottom of the ninth inning of a tie game with Enrique Hernández at third base. There have been at least 25 such walk-off balks (or "balk-offs") in major league history since 1914.

The Kansas City Royals won two games in the 2023 season via a balk-off. The first was on August 1 vs. the New York Mets in the bottom of the 10th inning when relief pitcher Josh Walker balked before throwing a single pitch, scoring MJ Melendez and resulting in a 7–6 victory for the Royals. The Royals' second balk-off victory came 36 days later in a game against the Chicago White Sox on September 5 when Gregory Santos balked with two outs in the ninth inning and the bases loaded to score Maikel García; coincidentally, this game also ended with a score of 7–6. According to Elias Sports Bureau, the 2023 Royals are the only team in the live-ball era to have multiple balk-off wins in a single season.

On June 14, 2019, Dodgers closer Kenley Jansen intentionally balked during a game with the Chicago Cubs. With the Dodgers leading, 5–3, and two outs in the top of the ninth inning, the Cubs' Jason Heyward was on second base. Concerned that a runner at second base could possibly steal signs, Jansen intentionally balked, advancing the runner to third base. Jansen then struck out batter Víctor Caratini for the final out of the game. Jansen repeated this ploy while pitching for the Los Angeles Angels against the Dodgers on May 17, 2025, intentionally balking Shohei Ohtani from second base to third base, and then retiring Mookie Betts for the last out of game. Other intentional balks, while rare, have subsequently occurred in MLB.

== In other media ==
In Peanuts comic strips from August 1963, Charlie Brown's baseball team was one run away from winning a championship; however, the opposing team was batting with the bases loaded. In the August 5 strip, Charlie Brown balked in the tying run, and in the next day's strip, he balked in the winning run.
