= Home run =

Four-base hit resulting in a run by the batter in baseball

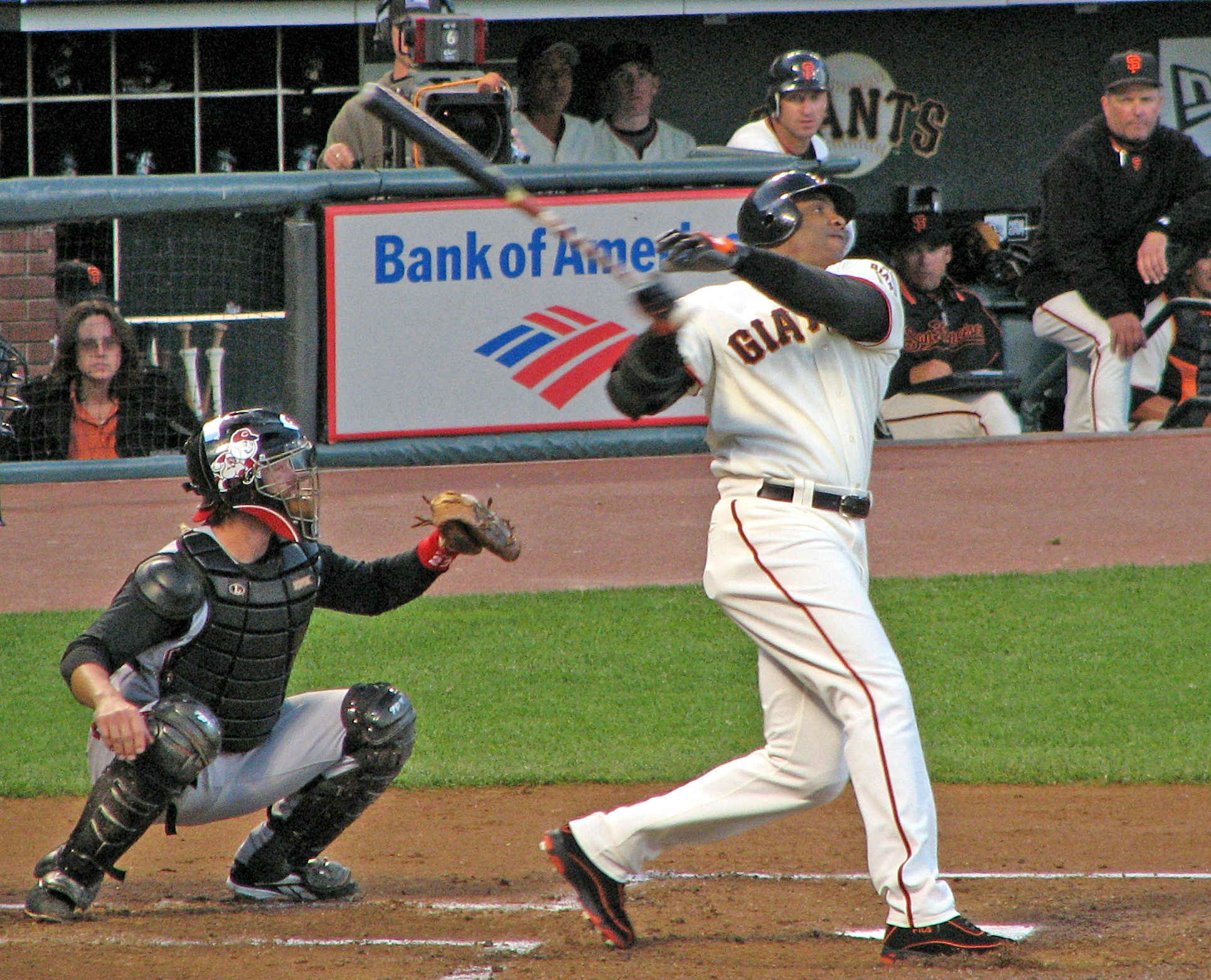
Barry Bonds holds the all-time home run record in Major League Baseball

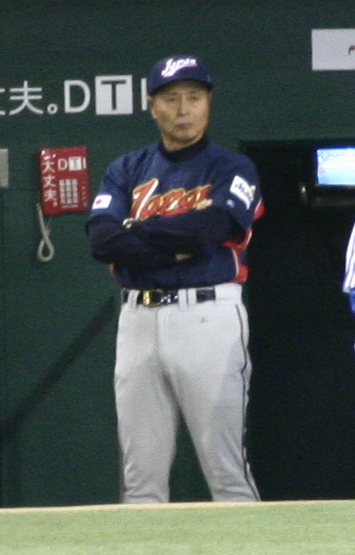
Sadaharu Oh, pictured here in 2006, holds the officially verified all-time world home run record in professional baseball.

In baseball, a home run (abbreviated HR) is scored when the ball is hit in such a way that the batter is able to circle the bases and reach home plate safely in one play without any errors being committed by the defensive team. A home run is usually achieved by hitting the ball over the outfield fence between the foul poles (or hitting either foul pole) without the ball touching the field.

Inside-the-park home runs, when the batter reaches home safely while the baseball is in play on the field, are infrequent. In very rare cases, a fielder attempting to catch a ball in flight may misplay it and knock it over the outfield fence, resulting in a home run.

An official scorer will credit the batter with a hit, a run scored, and a run batted in (RBI), as well as an RBI for each runner on base. The pitcher is recorded as having given up a hit and a run, with additional runs charged for each base-runner that scores.

Home runs are among the most popular aspects of baseball and, as a result, prolific home run hitters are usually the most popular among fans and consequently the highest paid by teams—hence the old saying, "Home run hitters drive Cadillacs, and singles hitters drive Fords" (coined, circa 1948, by veteran pitcher Fritz Ostermueller, by way of mentoring his young teammate, Ralph Kiner).

Nicknames for a home run include "homer", "round-tripper", "four-bagger", "big fly", "goner" "dinger", "long ball", "jack", "quadruple", "moon shot", "bomb", "tater", and "blast", while a player hitting a home run may be said to have "gone deep" or "gone yard".

== Types of home runs ==
=== Out of the park ===
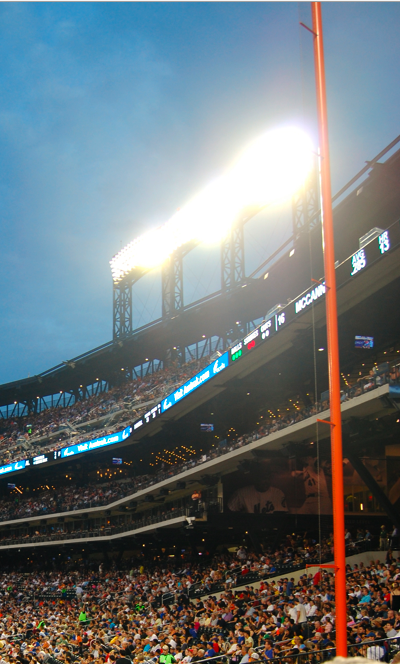
If a batted ball hits the foul pole (orange pole on the right), the ball is fair, and a home run is awarded to the batter.

A home run is most often scored when the ball is hit over the outfield wall between the foul poles (in fair territory) before it touches the ground (in flight), and without being caught or deflected back onto the field by a fielder. A batted ball is also a home run if it touches either a foul pole or its attached screen before touching the ground, as the foul poles are by definition in fair territory. Additionally, many major-league ballparks have ground rules stating that a batted ball in flight that strikes a specified location or fixed object is a home run; this usually applies to objects that are beyond the outfield wall but are located such that it may be difficult for the umpire to judge.

In professional baseball, a batted ball that goes over the outfield wall after touching the ground (i.e. a ball that bounces over the outfield wall) becomes an automatic double. This is colloquially referred to as a "ground rule double" even though it is uniform across all of Major League Baseball, per MLB rules 5.05(a)(6) through 5.05(a)(9).

A fielder is allowed to reach over the wall to try to catch the ball as long as his feet are on or over the field during the attempt, and if the fielder successfully catches the ball while it is in flight the batter is out, even if the ball had already passed the vertical plane of the wall. However, since the fielder is not part of the field, a ball that bounces off a fielder (including his glove) and over the wall without touching the ground is still a home run. A fielder may not deliberately throw his glove, cap, or any other equipment or apparel to stop or deflect a fair ball, and an umpire may award a home run to the batter if a fielder does so on a ball that, in the umpire's judgment, would have otherwise been a home run (this is rare in modern professional baseball).

A home run accomplished in any of the above manners is an automatic home run. The ball is dead, even if it rebounds back onto the field (e.g., from striking a foul pole), and the batter and any preceding runners cannot be put out at any time while running the bases. However, if one or more runners fail to touch a base or one runner passes another before reaching home plate, that runner or runners can be called out on appeal, though in the case of not touching a base a runner can go back and touch it if doing so will not cause them to be passed by another preceding runner and they have not yet touched the next base (or home plate in the case of missing third base). This stipulation is in Approved Ruling (2) of Rule 7.10(b).

=== Inside-the-park home run ===
An inside-the-park home run is a rare play in which a batter rounds all four bases for a home run without the baseball leaving the field of play. Unlike with an outside-the-park home run, the batter-runner and all preceding runners are liable to be put out by the defensive team at any time while running the bases. This can only happen if the ball does not leave the ballfield.

In the early days of baseball, outfields were much more spacious, reducing the likelihood of an over-the-fence home run, while increasing the likelihood of an inside-the-park home run, as a ball getting past an outfielder had more distance that it could roll before a fielder could track it down.

Modern outfields are much less spacious and more uniformly designed than in the game's early days. Therefore, inside-the-park home runs are now rare. They usually occur when a fast runner hits the ball deep into the outfield and the ball bounces in an unexpected direction away from the nearest outfielder (e.g., off a divot in the field or off the outfield wall), the nearest outfielder is injured on the play and cannot get to the ball, or an outfielder misjudges the flight of the ball in a way that he cannot quickly recover from the mistake (e.g., by diving and missing). The speed of the runner is crucial as even triples are relatively rare in most modern ballparks.

If any defensive play on an inside-the-park home run is labeled an error by the official scorer, a home run is not scored. Instead, it is scored as a single, double, triple, or even not a hit. The batter-runner and any applicable preceding runners are said to have taken all additional bases on error. All runs scored on such a play, however, still count.

An example of an unexpected bounce occurred during the 2007 Major League Baseball All-Star Game at AT&T Park in San Francisco on July 10, 2007. Ichiro Suzuki of the American League team hit a fly ball that caromed off the right-center field wall in the opposite direction from where National League right fielder Ken Griffey Jr. was expecting it to go. By the time the ball was relayed, Ichiro had already crossed the plate standing up. This was the first inside-the-park home run in All-Star Game history and led to Suzuki being named the game's Most Valuable Player.

== Number of runs batted in ==
Home runs are often characterized by the number of runners on base at the time. A home run hit with the bases empty is never called a "one-run homer", but rather a solo home run, solo homer, or "solo shot". With one runner on base, two runs score (the base-runner and the batter), and thus the home run is often called a two-run homer or two-run shot. Similarly, a home run with two runners on base is a three-run homer or three-run shot.

The term "four-run homer" is never used. Instead, it is called a "grand slam". Hitting a grand slam is the best possible result for the batter's turn at bat and the worst possible result for the pitcher and his team.

=== Grand slam ===
A grand slam occurs when the bases are "loaded" (that is, base runners are at first, second, and third base) and the batter hits a home run. According to The Dickson Baseball Dictionary, the term originated in the card game of contract bridge. An inside-the-park grand slam is a grand slam that is also an inside-the-park home run, a home run without the ball leaving the field, and it is very rare, due to the relative rarity of loading the bases along with the significant rarity (nowadays) of inside-the-park home runs.

On July 25, 1956, Roberto Clemente became the only MLB player to have ever scored a walk-off inside-the-park grand slam in a 9–8 Pittsburgh Pirates win over the Chicago Cubs, at Forbes Field.

On April 23, 1999, Fernando Tatís Sr. made history by hitting two grand slams in one inning, both against Chan Ho Park of the Los Angeles Dodgers. With this feat, Tatís also set a Major League record with 8 RBI in one inning.

On July 29, 2003, against the Texas Rangers, Bill Mueller of the Boston Red Sox became the only player in major league history to hit two grand slams in one game from opposite sides of the plate; he hit three home runs in that game, and his two grand slams were in consecutive at-bats.

On August 25, 2011, the New York Yankees became the first team to hit three grand slams in one game vs the Oakland A's. The Yankees eventually won the game 22–9, after trailing 7–1.

On October 25, 2024, Freddie Freeman made history by hitting a walk-off grand slam in the bottom of the 10th inning in Game 1 of the World Series, leading the Los Angeles Dodgers to a 6-3 victory over the New York Yankees. Freeman is the only player in MLB history to do so in the World Series.

== Specific situation home runs ==
These types of home runs are characterized by the specific game situation in which they occur, and can theoretically occur on either an outside-the-park or inside-the-park home run.

=== Walk-off home run ===
A walk-off home run is a home run hit by the home team in the bottom of the ninth inning, any extra inning, or other scheduled final inning, which gives the home team the lead and thereby ends the game. The term is attributed to Hall of Fame relief pitcher Dennis Eckersley, so named because after the run is scored, the losing team has to "walk off" the field.

Two World Series have ended via the "walk-off" home run. The first was the 1960 World Series when Bill Mazeroski of the Pittsburgh Pirates hit a ninth-inning solo home run in the seventh game of the series off New York Yankees pitcher Ralph Terry to give the Pirates the World Championship. The second time was the 1993 World Series when Joe Carter of the Toronto Blue Jays hit a ninth-inning three-run home run off Philadelphia Phillies pitcher Mitch Williams in Game 6 of the series, to help the Toronto Blue Jays capture their second World Series Championship in a row.

Such a home run can also be called a "sudden death" or "sudden victory" home run. That usage has lessened as "walk-off home run" has gained favor. Along with Mazeroski's 1960 shot, the most famous walk-off or sudden-death home run would most likely be the "Shot Heard 'Round the World" hit by Bobby Thomson to win the 1951 National League pennant for the New York Giants, along with many other game-ending home runs that famously ended some of the most important and suspenseful baseball games.

A walk-off home run over the fence is an exception to baseball's one-run rule. Normally if the home team is tied or behind in the ninth or extra innings, the game ends as soon as the home team scores enough runs to achieve a lead. If the home team has two outs in the inning, and the game is tied, the game will officially end either the moment the batter successfully reaches first base or the moment the runner touches home plate—whichever happens last. However, this is superseded by the "ground rule", which provides automatic doubles (when a ball-in-play hits the ground first and then leaves the playing field) and home runs (when a ball-in-play leaves the playing field without ever touching the ground). In the latter case, all base runners including the batter are allowed to cross the plate.

=== Leadoff home run ===
A leadoff home run is a home run hit by the first batter of a team, the leadoff hitter of the first inning of the game. In MLB (major league Baseball), Rickey Henderson holds the career record with 81 lead-off home runs. Craig Biggio holds the National League career record with 53, fourth overall following Henderson, George Springer with 61, and Alfonso Soriano with 54. As of August 26, 2025, Springer holds the career record among active players, with 61 leadoff home runs, which also ranks second all-time.

In 1996, Brady Anderson set a Major League record by hitting a lead-off home run in four consecutive games.

=== Back-to-back ===
When consecutive batters hit home runs, it's referred to as back-to-back home runs. The home runs are still considered back-to-back even if the batters hit their home runs off different pitchers. A third batter hitting a home run is commonly referred to as back-to-back-to-back.

Four home runs in a row have only occurred eleven times in Major League Baseball history. Following convention, this is called back-to-back-to-back-to-back. The most recent occurrence was on July 2, 2022, when the St. Louis Cardinals hit four in a row against the Philadelphia Phillies. Nolan Arenado, Nolan Gorman, Juan Yepez, and Dylan Carlson hit consecutive home runs during the first inning off starting pitcher Kyle Gibson.

On June 9, 2019, the Washington Nationals hit four in a row against the San Diego Padres in Petco Park as Howie Kendrick, Trea Turner, Adam Eaton and Anthony Rendon homered off pitcher Craig Stammen. Stammen became the fifth pitcher to surrender back-to-back-to-back-to-back home runs, following Paul Foytack on July 31, 1963, Chase Wright on April 22, 2007, Dave Bush on August 10, 2010, and Michael Blazek on July 27, 2017.

On August 14, 2008, the Chicago White Sox defeated the Kansas City Royals 9–2. In this game, Jim Thome, Paul Konerko, Alexei Ramírez, and Juan Uribe hit back-to-back-to-back-to-back home runs in that order. Thome, Konerko, and Ramirez hit their home runs against Joel Peralta, while Uribe did it off Rob Tejeda.

On April 22, 2007, the Boston Red Sox were trailing the New York Yankees 3–0 when Manny Ramirez, J. D. Drew, Mike Lowell and Jason Varitek hit consecutive home runs to put them up 4–3. They eventually went on to win the game 7–6 after a three-run home run by Mike Lowell in the bottom of the seventh inning. On September 18, 2006, trailing 9–5 to the San Diego Padres in the ninth inning, Jeff Kent, J. D. Drew, Russell Martin, and Marlon Anderson of the Los Angeles Dodgers hit back-to-back-to-back-to-back home runs to tie the game. After giving up a run in the top of the tenth, the Dodgers won the game in the bottom of the tenth, on a walk-off two-run home run by Nomar Garciaparra. J. D. Drew has been part of two different sets of back-to-back-to-back-to-back home runs. In both occurrences, his home run was the second of the four.

On September 30, 1997, in the sixth inning of Game One of the American League Division Series between the New York Yankees and Cleveland Indians, Tim Raines, Derek Jeter and Paul O'Neill hit back-to-back-to-back home runs for the Yankees. Raines' home run tied the game. New York went on to win 8–6. This was the first occurrence of three home runs in a row ever in postseason play. The Boston Red Sox repeated the feat in Game Four of the 2007 American League Championship Series, also against the Indians. The Indians returned the favor in Game One of the 2016 American League Division Series.

Twice in MLB history, two brothers have hit back-to-back home runs. On April 23, 2013, brothers Melvin Upton Jr. (formerly B.J. Upton) and Justin Upton hit back-to-back home runs. The first time was on September 15, 1938, when Lloyd Waner and Paul Waner performed the feat.

Simple back-to-back home runs are a relatively frequent occurrence. If a pitcher gives up a home run, he might have his concentration broken and might alter his normal approach in an attempt to "make up for it" by striking out the next batter with some fastballs. Sometimes the next batter will be expecting that and will capitalize on it. A notable back-to-back home run of that type in World Series play involved "Babe Ruth's called shot" in 1932, which was accompanied by various Ruthian theatrics, yet the pitcher, Charlie Root, was allowed to stay in the game. He delivered just one more pitch, which Lou Gehrig drilled out of the park for a back-to-back shot, after which Root was removed from the game.

In Game 3 of the 1976 NLCS, George Foster and Johnny Bench hit back-to-back home runs in the last of the ninth off Ron Reed to tie the game. The Series-winning run was scored later in the inning.

Another notable pair of back-to-back home runs occurred on September 14, 1990, when Ken Griffey Sr. and Ken Griffey Jr. hit back-to-back home runs, off Kirk McCaskill, the only father-and-son duo to do so in Major League history.

On May 2, 2002, Bret Boone and Mike Cameron of the Seattle Mariners hit back-to-back home runs off starter Jon Rauch in the first inning of a game against the Chicago White Sox. The Mariners batted around in the inning, and Boone and Cameron came up to bat against reliever Jim Parque with two outs, again hitting back-to-back home runs and becoming the only pair of teammates to hit back-to-back home runs twice in the same inning.

On June 19, 2012, José Bautista and Colby Rasmus hit back-to-back home runs and back-to-back-to-back home runs with Edwin Encarnación for a lead change in each instance.

On July 23, 2017, Whit Merrifield, Jorge Bonifacio, and Eric Hosmer of the Kansas City Royals hit back-to-back-to-back home runs in the fourth inning against the Chicago White Sox. The Royals went on to win the game 5–4.

On June 20, 2018, George Springer, Alex Bregman, and Jose Altuve of the Houston Astros hit back-to-back-to-back home runs in the sixth inning against the Tampa Bay Rays. The Astros went on to win the game 5–1.

On April 3, 2018, the St. Louis Cardinals began the game against the Milwaukee Brewers with back-to-back home runs from Dexter Fowler and Tommy Pham. Then in the bottom of the ninth, with two outs and the Cardinals leading 4–3, Christian Yelich homered to tie the game; and Ryan Braun hit the next pitch for a walk-off home run. This is the only major league game to begin and end with back-to-back home runs.

On May 5, 2019, Eugenio Suarez, Jesse Winker and Derek Dietrich of the Cincinnati Reds, hit back-to-back-to-back home runs on three straight pitches against Jeff Samardzija of the San Francisco Giants in the bottom of the first inning.

On October 30, 2021, Dansby Swanson and Jorge Soler hit back-to-back home runs for the Atlanta Braves off Houston Astros pitcher Cristian Javier to give the Braves a 3–2 lead in the bottom of the seventh in Game 4 of the World Series.

On October 18, 2024, Aaron Judge and Giancarlo Stanton hit back-to-back quadruples to take the lead in a game of the American League Championship Series.

On March 29, 2025, New York Yankees batters Paul Goldschmidt, Cody Bellinger, and Aaron Judge became the first trio to hit back-to-back-to-back home runs on the first three pitches of a game. They accomplished this feat against Milwaukee Brewers pitcher Nestor Cortes.

On April 29, 2025, New York Yankees batters Trent Grisham, Aaron Judge, and Ben Rice hit back-to-back-to-back home runs in the top of the first inning off Baltimore Orioles pitcher Kyle Gibson. The Yankees became the first team to hit three consecutive homers to start a game twice in one season.

=== Consecutive home runs by one batter ===
The record for consecutive home runs by a batter under any circumstances is four. Of the sixteen players (through 2012) who have hit four in one game, six have hit them consecutively. Twenty-eight other batters have hit four consecutive across two games.

Bases on balls do not count as at-bats, and Ted Williams holds the record for consecutive home runs across the most games, four in four games played, during September 17–22, 1957, for the Red Sox. Williams hit a pinch-hit home run on the 17th; walked as a pinch-hitter on the 18th; there was no game on the 19th; hit another pinch-homer on the 20th; homered and then was lifted for a pinch-runner after at least one walk, on the 21st; and homered after at least one walk on the 22nd. All in all, he had four walks interspersed among his four homers.

In World Series play, Reggie Jackson hit a record three in one Series game, the final game (Game 6) in 1977. But those three were a part of a much more impressive feat. He walked on four pitches in the second inning of game 6. Then he hit his three home runs on the first pitch of his next three at-bats, off three different pitchers (4th inning: Hooten; 5th inning: Sosa; 8th inning: Hough). He had also hit one in his last at-bat of the previous game, giving him four home runs on four consecutive swings. The four in a row set the record for consecutive homers across two Series games.

In Game 3 of the World Series in 2011, Albert Pujols hit three home runs to tie the record with Babe Ruth and Reggie Jackson. The St. Louis Cardinals went on to win the World Series in Game 7 at Busch Stadium. In Game 1 of the World Series in 2012, Pablo Sandoval of the San Francisco Giants hit three home runs on his first three at-bats of the Series.

Nomar Garciaparra holds the record for consecutive home runs in the shortest time in terms of innings: three home runs in two innings, on July 23, 2002, for the Boston Red Sox.

=== Home run cycle ===
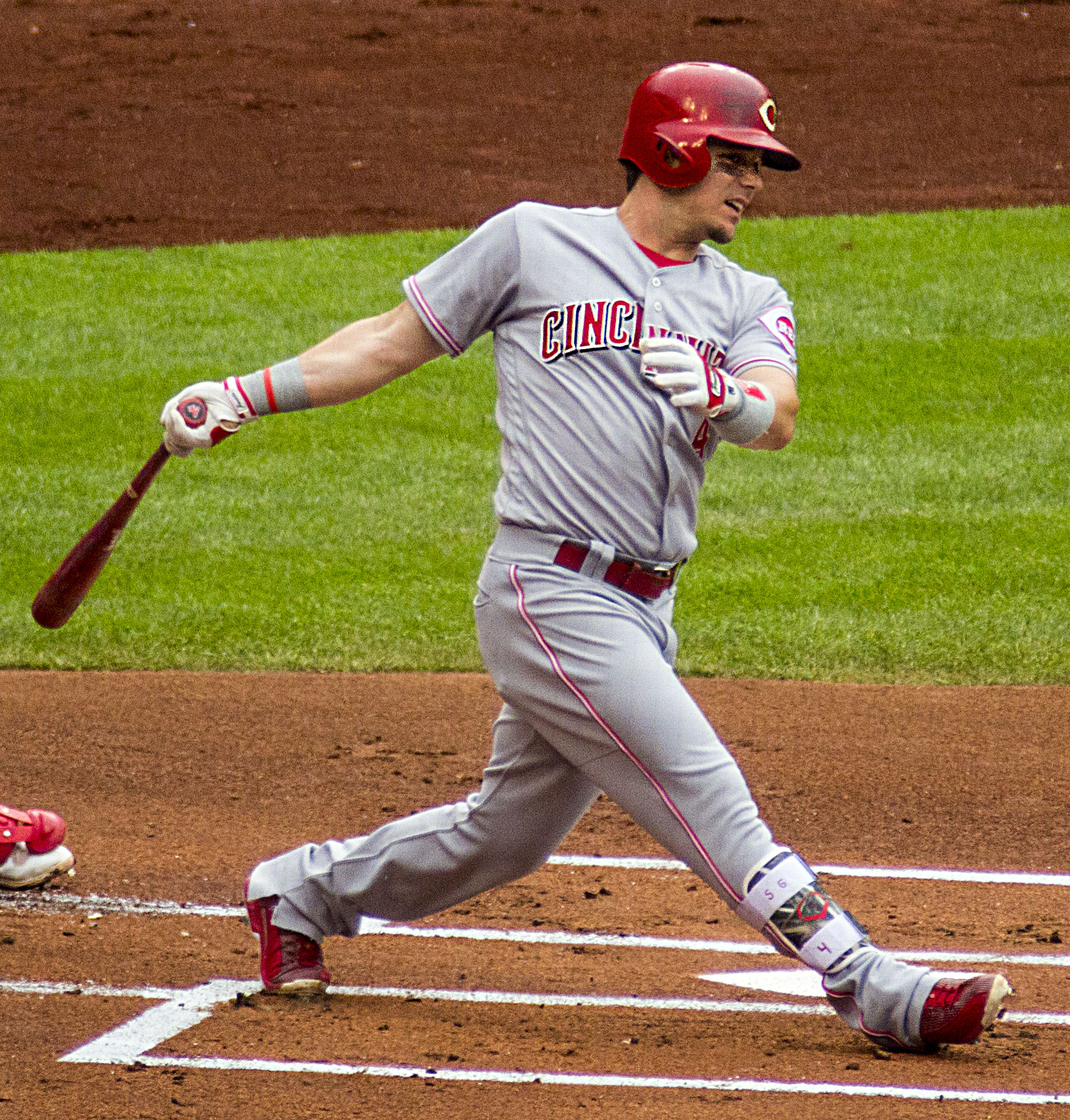
Scooter Gennett had four home runs in a 2017 game, nearly completing a home run cycle.

An offshoot of hitting for the cycle, a "home run cycle" is when a player hits a solo home run, two-run home run, three-run home run, and grand slam all in one game. This is an extremely rare feat, as it requires the batter not only to hit four home runs in the game but also to hit the home runs with a specific number of runners already on base. This is largely dependent on circumstances outside of the player's control, such as teammates' ability to get on base, and the order in which the player comes to bat in any particular inning. A further variant of the home run cycle would be the "natural home run cycle", should a batter hit the home runs in the specific order listed above.

A home run cycle has never occurred in MLB, which has only had 21 instances of a player hitting four home runs in a game. Though multiple home run cycles have been recorded in collegiate baseball, there have been two known home run cycles in a professional baseball game: one belongs to Tyrone Horne, playing for the Arkansas Travelers in a Double-A level Minor League Baseball game against the San Antonio Missions on July 27, 1998, and the other was accomplished by Chandler Redmond of the Springfield Cardinals, of the Texas League in a game against the Amarillo Sod Poodles on August 10, 2022.

Major league players have come close to hitting a home run cycle, two notable examples being Scooter Gennett of the Cincinnati Reds on June 6, 2017, and Mark Whiten of the St. Louis Cardinals on September 7, 1993. Gennett hit four home runs against the St. Louis Cardinals. He hit a grand slam in the third inning, a two-run home run in the fourth inning, a solo home run in the sixth inning, and a two-run home run in the eighth inning. He had an opportunity for a three-run home run in the first inning but drove in one run with a single in that at-bat. Whiten hit a grand slam in the first inning, a three-run home run in both the sixth and seventh inning, and a two-run home run in the ninth inning. In doing so, he also tied the MLB record for total RBIs in a game with 12.

On Sept 8, 2024 Pavin Smith of the Arizona Diamondbacks hit 3 consecutive home runs versus the Houston Astros to have a shot at the Home Run Cycle. He hit a 3 run HR in the 2nd, a Grand Slam in the 3rd, and a solo HR in the 5th. He struck out with a man on base in his final at-bat.

== History ==
Graph depicting the yearly number of home runs (blue line), and stolen bases (pink line) per MLB game from 1900 to 2008.

In the early days of the game, when the ball was less lively and the ballparks generally had very large outfields, most home runs were of the inside-the-park variety. The first home run ever hit in the National League was by Ross Barnes of the Chicago White Stockings (now known as the Chicago Cubs), in 1876. The home "run" was literally descriptive. Home runs over the fence were rare, and only in ballparks where a fence was fairly close. Hitters were discouraged from trying to hit home runs, with the conventional wisdom being that if they tried to do so they would simply fly out. This was a serious concern in the 19th century because in baseball's early days, a ball caught after one bounce was still an out. The emphasis was on place-hitting and what is now called "manufacturing runs" or "small ball".

The home run's place in baseball changed dramatically when the live-ball era began after World War I. First, the materials and manufacturing processes improved significantly, making the now-mass-produced, cork-centered ball somewhat more lively. Batters such as Babe Ruth and Rogers Hornsby took full advantage of rules changes that were instituted during the 1920s, particularly the prohibition of the spitball, and the requirement that balls be replaced when worn or dirty. These changes resulted in the baseball being easier to see and hit, and easier to hit out of the park. Meanwhile, as the game's popularity boomed, more outfield seating was built, shrinking the size of the outfield and increasing the chances of a long fly ball resulting in a home run. The teams with the sluggers, typified by the New York Yankees, became the championship teams, and other teams had to change their focus from the "inside game" to the "power game" in order to keep up.

Before 1931, Major League Baseball considered a fair ball that bounced over an outfield fence to be a home run. The rule was changed to require the ball to clear the fence on the fly, and balls that reached the seats on a bounce became automatic doubles (often referred to as a ground rule double). The last "bounce" home run in MLB was hit by Eddie Moore of the Brooklyn Robins on September 27, 1930, at Ebbets Field. A carryover of the old rule is that if a player deflects a ball over the outfield fence in fair territory without it touching the ground, it is a home run, per MLB rule 5.05(a)(9). Additionally, MLB rule 5.05(a)(5) still stipulates that a ball hit over a fence in fair territory that is less than 250 feet (76 m) from home plate "shall entitle the batter to advance to second base only", as some early ballparks had short dimensions.

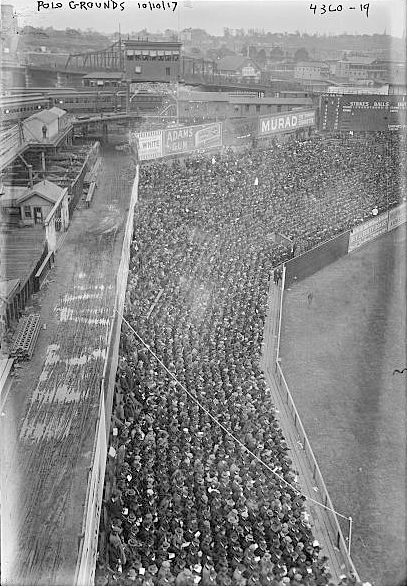
The Polo Grounds left field foul line with guide rope, as seen from the upper deck, 1917

Also until circa 1931, the ball had to go not only over the fence in fair territory, but it had to land in the bleachers in fair territory or still be visibly fair when disappearing from view. The rule stipulated "fair when last seen" by the umpires. Photos from that era in ballparks, such as the Polo Grounds and Yankee Stadium, show ropes strung from the foul poles to the back of the bleachers, or a second "foul pole" at the back of the bleachers, in a straight line with the foul line, as a visual aid for the umpire. Ballparks still use a visual aid much like the ropes; a net or screen attached to the foul poles on the fair side has replaced ropes. As with American football, where a touchdown once required a literal "touch down" of the ball in the end zone but now only requires the "breaking of the [vertical] plane" of the goal line, in baseball the ball needs only "break the plane" of the fence in fair territory (unless the ball is caught by a player who is in play, in which case the batter is called out).

Babe Ruth's 60th home run in 1927 was somewhat controversial because it landed barely in fair territory in the stands down the right field line. Ruth lost many home runs in his career due to the when-last-seen rule. Bill Jenkinson, in The Year Babe Ruth Hit 104 Home Runs, estimates that Ruth lost at least 50 and as many as 78 in his career due to this rule.

Further, the rules once stipulated that an over-the-fence home run in a sudden-victory situation would only count for as many bases as was necessary to "force" the winning run home. For example, if a team trailed by two runs with the bases loaded, and the batter hit a fair ball over the fence, it only counted as a triple, because the runner immediately ahead of him had technically already scored the game-winning run. That rule was changed in the 1920s as home runs became increasingly frequent and popular. Babe Ruth's career total of 714 would have been one higher had that rule not been in effect in the early part of his career.

In the 2020s, it has become increasingly popular for Major League teams to celebrate home runs using some sort of prop. For example, allowing the player to wear or hold an item, such as a hat, helmet, jacket, sword, or trident.

== Records ==
Major League Baseball keeps running totals of all-time home runs by the team, including teams no longer active (before 1900) as well as by individual players. Gary Sheffield hit the 250,000th home run in all of MLB history (according to the then-current definition of the major leagues, which excluded Negro league baseball) with a grand slam on September 8, 2008. Sheffield had hit MLB's 249,999th home run against Gio González in his previous at-bat.

The all-time, verified professional baseball record for career home runs for one player, excluding the U.S. Negro leagues during the era of segregation, is held by Sadaharu Oh. Oh spent his entire career playing for the Yomiuri Giants in Japan's Nippon Professional Baseball, later managing the Giants, the Fukuoka SoftBank Hawks and the 2006 World Baseball Classic Japanese team. Oh holds the all-time home run world record, having hit 868 home runs in his career.

In Major League Baseball, the career record is 762, held by Barry Bonds, who broke Hank Aaron’s record on August 7, 2007, when he hit his 756th home run at AT&T Park off pitcher Mike Bacsik. Only eight other major league players have hit as many as 600: Hank Aaron (755), Babe Ruth (714), Albert Pujols (703), Alex Rodriguez (696), Willie Mays (660), Ken Griffey Jr. (630), Jim Thome (612), and Sammy Sosa (609). Giancarlo Stanton holds the record for currently active MLB players with 453 as of the end of the 2025 season.

The single-season record is 73, set by Barry Bonds in 2001. Other notable single-season records were achieved by Babe Ruth who hit 60 in 1927, Roger Maris, with 61 home runs in 1961, Aaron Judge, with 62 home runs in 2022 (the American League record), and Sammy Sosa and Mark McGwire, who hit 66 and 70 respectively, in 1998.

Negro league slugger Josh Gibson's Baseball Hall of Fame plaque says he hit "almost 800" home runs in his career. The Guinness Book of World Records lists Gibson's lifetime home run total at 800. Ken Burns' award-winning series, Baseball, states that his actual total may have been as high as 950. Gibson's true total is not known, in part due to inconsistent record-keeping in the Negro leagues. The 1993 edition of the MacMillan Baseball Encyclopedia attempted to compile a set of Negro league records, and subsequent work has expanded on that effort. Those records demonstrate that Gibson and Ruth were of comparable power. The 1993 book had Gibson hitting 146 home runs in the 501 "official" Negro League games they were able to account for in his 17-year career, about one home run every 3.4 games. Babe Ruth, in 22 seasons (several of them in the dead-ball era), hit 714 in 2503 games, or one home run every 3.5 games. The large gap in the numbers for Gibson reflects the fact that Negro League clubs played relatively far fewer league games and many more "barnstorming" or exhibition games during the course of a season, than did the major league clubs of that era.

Other legendary home run hitters include Jimmie Foxx, Mel Ott, Ted Williams, Mickey Mantle (who on September 10, 1960, mythically hit "the longest home run ever" at an estimated distance of 643 feet (196 m), although this was measured after the ball stopped rolling), Reggie Jackson, Harmon Killebrew, Ernie Banks, Mike Schmidt, Dave Kingman, Sammy Sosa (who hit 60 or more home runs in a season three times), Ken Griffey Jr. and Eddie Mathews. In 1987, Joey Meyer of the minor league Denver Zephyrs hit the longest verifiable home run in professional baseball history. The home run was measured at a distance of 582 feet (177 m) and was hit inside Denver's Mile High Stadium. On May 6, 1964, Chicago White Sox outfielder Dave Nicholson hit a home run officially measured at 573 feet that either bounced atop the left-field roof of Comiskey Park or entirely cleared it. Major League Baseball's longest verifiable home run distance is about 575 feet (175 m), by Babe Ruth, to straightaway center field at Tiger Stadium (then called Navin Field and before the double-deck), which landed nearly across the intersection of Trumbull and Cherry.

The location of where Hank Aaron's record 755th home run landed has been monumented in Milwaukee. The spot sits outside American Family Field, where the Milwaukee Brewers currently play. Similarly, the point where Aaron's 715th home run landed, upon breaking Ruth's career record in 1974, is marked in the Turner Field parking lot. A red-painted seat in Fenway Park marks the landing place of the 502-ft home run Ted Williams hit in 1946, the longest measured home run in Fenway's history; a red stadium seat mounted on the wall of the Mall of America in Bloomington, Minnesota, marks the landing spot of Harmon Killebrew's record 520-foot shot in old Metropolitan Stadium.

May 2019 saw 1,135 MLB home runs, the highest ever number of home runs in a single month in Major League Baseball history. During this month, 44.5% of all runs scored were the result of a home run, breaking the previous record of 42.3%.

=== Postseason ===
In postseason play, the most home runs hit by a player for a career is Manny Ramirez, who hit 29. Jose Altuve (28), Kyle Schwarber (24), George Springer (23), Bernie Williams (22) and Derek Jeter (20) are the only other players to hit twenty postseason home runs. Rounding out the top ten as of the end of the 2021 season are Albert Pujols (19), Carlos Correa (18), Reggie Jackson (18), Mickey Mantle (18, all in the World Series), and Nelson Cruz (18). As for most home runs in one postseason, Randy Arozarena holds the record with ten, done in the 2020 postseason.

== Instant replay ==
Replays "to get the call right" have been used extremely sporadically in the past, but the use of instant replay to determine "boundary calls"—home runs and foul balls—was not officially allowed until 2008.

In a game on May 31, 1999, involving the St. Louis Cardinals and Florida Marlins, a hit by Cliff Floyd of the Marlins was initially ruled a double, then a home run, then was changed back to a double when umpire Frank Pulli decided to review video of the play. The Marlins protested that video replay was not allowed, but while the National League office agreed that replay was not to be used in future games, it declined the protest on the grounds it was a judgment call, and the play stood.

In November 2007, the general managers of Major League Baseball voted in favor of implementing instant replay reviews on boundary home run calls. The proposal limited the use of instant replay to determining whether a boundary/home run call is:

- A fair (home run) or foul ball
- A live ball (ball hit a fence and rebounded onto the field), ground rule double (ball hit a fence before leaving the field), or home run (ball hit some object beyond the fence while in flight)
- Spectator interference or home run (spectator touched the ball after it broke the plane of the fence).

On August 28, 2008, instant replay review became available in MLB for reviewing calls in accordance with the above proposal. It was first utilized on September 3, 2008, in a game between the New York Yankees and the Tampa Bay Rays at Tropicana Field. Alex Rodriguez of the Yankees hit what appeared to be a home run, but the ball hit a catwalk behind the foul pole. It was at first called a home run until Tampa Bay manager Joe Maddon argued the call, and the umpires decided to review the play. After 2 minutes and 15 seconds, the umpires came back and ruled it a home run.

About two weeks later, on September 19, also at Tropicana Field, a boundary call was overturned for the first time. In this case, Carlos Peña of the Rays was given a ground rule double in a game against the Minnesota Twins after an umpire believed a fan reached into the field of play to catch a fly ball in right field. The umpires reviewed the play, determined the fan did not reach over the fence, and reversed the call, awarding Peña a home run.

Aside from the two aforementioned reviews at Tampa Bay, the replay was used four more times in the 2008 MLB regular season: twice at Houston, once at Seattle, and once at San Francisco. The San Francisco incident is perhaps the most unusual. Bengie Molina, the Giants' catcher, hit what was first called a single. Molina then was replaced in the game by Emmanuel Burriss, a pinch-runner, before the umpires re-evaluated the call and ruled it a home run. In this instance though, Molina was not allowed to return to the game to complete the run, as he had already been replaced. Molina was credited with the home run, and two RBIs, but not for the run scored which went to Burriss instead.

On October 31, 2009, in the fourth inning of Game 3 of the World Series, Alex Rodriguez hit a long fly ball that hit a camera protruding over the wall and into the field of play in deep right field. The ball ricocheted off the camera and re-entered the field, initially ruled a double. However, after the umpires consulted with each other after watching the instant replay, the hit was ruled a home run, marking the first time an instant replay home run was hit in a playoff game.

== See also ==
- Babe Ruth Home Run Award
- Home Run Derby
- Joe Bauman Home Run Award
- Josh Gibson Legacy Award
- List of Major League Baseball annual home run leaders (by year)
- Major League Baseball single-season home run record
- Mel Ott Award
- The Year Babe Ruth Hit 104 Home Runs, 2007 non-fiction book

=== Career achievements ===
- List of Major League Baseball players with 20 doubles, 20 triples, and 20 home runs in the same season
- 500 home run club
- List of Major League Baseball all-time leaders in home runs by pitchers
- List of Major League Baseball career home run leaders
- List of Major League Baseball players with a home run in their final major league at bat
- List of Major League Baseball players with a home run in their first major league at bat

=== Other sports ===
- Six (cricket)
- Wiffle ball
