= Pitching position =

Legal pitching positions in baseball

In baseball, there are two legal pitching positions: the windup, and the set. Colloquially, the set is often referred to as "the stretch", although this term actually only refers to one part of the pitching motion when pitching from the set.

== Definitions ==
=== Windup ===
A pitcher is in the windup when, with the ball, the pitcher stands on or directly in front of the pitching rubber, located at the top of the mound, with their feet pointing toward home plate. Prior to throwing a pitch, the pitcher has the option of taking one step back toward second base or to either side, using their free leg (left leg for a right-handed pitcher). During the delivery of the pitch, the pitcher must take one step forward, in the direction of home plate. Alternatively, the pitcher may step off the rubber with their pivot foot (the right foot, for right-handed pitchers) or step toward and throw or feign a throw to a base, subject to the balk rules. The balk rules do not apply if there are no runners on base. In the windup, the time of pitch is the instant when one of the following occurs: the pitcher commits to taking a step backward, or they take a step to the side, or bring their hands together.

=== Set ===
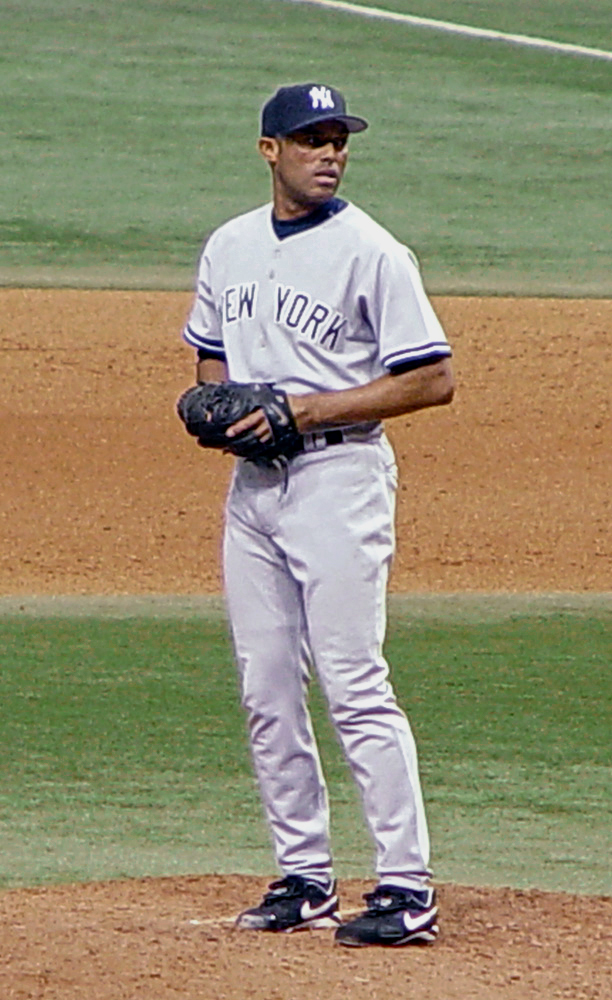
Mariano Rivera, closer for the New York Yankees, having come set

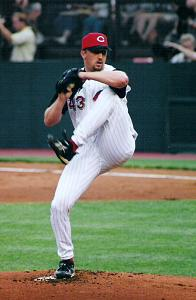
Jimmy Haynes of the Cincinnati Reds, pitching from the set, just before the time of pitch

A pitcher is in the set when, with the ball, they stand on, or directly in front of—and touching—the pitching rubber, with their toes pointing toward the side (toward third base for a right-handed pitcher) and their arms apart at their sides. This initial part of the set is called the stretch, because the pitcher usually stretches toward home plate to take signs from the catcher. At this point, the pitcher may make any number of preparatory movements necessary for delivering the pitch. The pitcher may optionally throw to a base or disengage the rubber, but in order to pitch, he first brings his arms together in front of his body (a movement punctuated with a discernible pause). This is called coming set. After coming set, the pitcher takes a step toward home and delivers the pitch. Typically, pitchers from the set use a high leg kick, thus lunging toward home in pitching; a pitcher may instead release the ball more quickly by using the slide step, quickly stepping directly and immediately toward home and pitching. In the set position, the time of pitch is that instant when the pitcher makes a move toward home plate after coming set.

As with the windup, prior to the time of pitch, the pitcher may step toward and throw or feign a throw to a base, subject to the balk rules, or disengage the rubber by stepping back (toward second base) with their pivot foot.

== Strengths and weaknesses ==
Both types of pitching position have their strengths and weaknesses. Compared to the set, the windup has a relatively slower execution, and it is therefore better suited for situations in which there are no baserunners or when the lead runner is on third base, because it is difficult to steal home plate. Conversely, a pitch from the set, having a relatively faster execution, is preferred when there are baserunners. Faster execution is important to prevent stolen bases.

However, some pitchers, particularly relief pitchers, are more comfortable pitching from the set position and thus use it regardless of the situation. Whether a pitcher starts from the windup or the stretch is all about what feels best for their own personal preference. The reason more than half of pitchers start from the windup position is because that type of motion gets a little bit more of a rhythm going before pitching.

== Impact ==
Data analysis indicates that pitch velocity is equivalent whether thrown from the windup or the set position.

Additionally, common wisdom is that the set is less damaging to the connective tissue of a pitcher's arm, but research in this area has been unable to support this hypothesis.
