= Fair ball =

Type of batted ball in baseball

In baseball, a fair ball is a batted ball that entitles the batter to attempt to reach first base. By contrast, a foul ball is a batted ball that does not entitle the batter to attempt to reach first base. Whether a batted ball is fair or foul is determined by the location of the ball at the appropriate reference point, as follows:

- if the ball leaves the playing field without touching anything, the point where the ball leaves the field;
- otherwise, if the ball first lands past first or third base without touching anything, the point where the ball lands;
- otherwise, if the ball rolls or bounces past first or third base without touching anything other than the ground, the point where the ball passes the base;
- otherwise, if the ball touches anything other than the ground (such as an umpire, a player, or any equipment left on the field) before any of the above happens, the point of such touching;
- otherwise, (the ball comes to a rest before reaching first or third base), the point where the ball comes to a rest.

If any part of the ball is on or above fair territory at the appropriate reference point, it is fair; otherwise, it is foul. Fair territory or fair ground is defined as the area of the playing field between the two foul lines, and includes the foul lines themselves and the foul poles. However, certain exceptions exist:

- A ball that touches first or third base is always fair.
- Under Rule 5.09(a)(7)-(8), if a batted ball touches the batter or his bat while the batter is in the batter's box and not intentionally interfering with the course of the ball, the ball is foul.
- A ball that hits the foul pole without first having touched anything else off the bat is fair.
- Ground rules may provide whether a ball hitting specific objects (e.g. roof, overhead speaker) is fair or foul.

On a fair ball, the batter attempts to reach first base or any subsequent base, runners attempt to advance and fielders try to record outs. A fair ball is considered a live ball until the ball becomes dead by leaving the field or any other method.
