= Fifth infielder =

Rare positioning choice in baseball

In baseball, a fifth infielder is the rare instance in which a team elects to bring in an outfielder to play the infield. This is usually done when the game is tied in the bottom of the ninth or an extra inning, the home team has a runner at 3rd base with fewer than two outs. Normally with a runner on 3rd with less than two outs, a manager will usually have the infield playing in, as to cut down a runner trying to score. Bringing the infield in is a typical strategy used late in games, when a potential tying, go-ahead, winning or crucial insurance run is at 3rd base with less than two outs. In cases like this, if a ball is hit right to an infielder, the infielder usually has a chance to throw out the runner trying to score. However, any ground ball not hit at an infielder will usually have a good chance to score the runner, plus the batter reaching base safely, versus if the infield plays back. When the infield plays back, it does make it more likely for the run to score, but the infielders are more likely to get the batter out via a ground out.

However, in an instance where if the runner at 3rd base scoring ends the game immediately, a team may elect to have a fifth infielder, as to decrease the chances of a groundball getting through. The drawback is that it decreases the chance of an outfielder getting to a potential fly ball that may result in a play at the plate, however, any fair fly ball hit deep enough is good enough to end the game.

For scorekeeping purposes, whatever position a player is listed as in the box score is the number they get assigned. For example, if a left fielder moves in to play the third base position, and a ball is hit to him, and he throws to the catcher to get the out, the play is recorded as 7–2.

== Examples ==
In 2012, in an Opening Day game between the Toronto Blue Jays and Cleveland Indians at Progressive Field in Cleveland, Ohio, in the bottom of the 12th, with the score tied 4–4, the Indians loaded the bases with one out. Manager John Farrell of the Blue Jays decided to take out left fielder Eric Thames and bring in veteran infielder Omar Vizquel (who won 11 Gold Gloves in his career) to play at second base, being the pivot of a potential double play. Sure enough, pitcher Luis Pérez got Asdrúbal Cabrera to ground into the inning ending double play, 6–4–3, although Vizquel was not involved in the double play. The Jays ended up winning 7–4 in 16 innings, which was the longest Opening Day game in MLB history.

Later in 2012, on September 13, 2012, in a game vs. the Tampa Bay Rays and Baltimore Orioles at Camden Yards in Baltimore, Maryland, with the game tied 2–2 in the bottom of the 13th, the Orioles loaded the bases with no one out. Rays manager Joe Maddon took out left fielder Sam Fuld to bring in infielder Reid Brignac to play in the middle of the infield. Rays pitcher Chris Archer ended up getting Robert Andino to ground into a force at home plate before striking out Matt Wieters and Nate McLouth to get out of the jam. The Orioles ended up winning 3–2 in 14 innings.

In 2014, on August 29, 2014, in a game vs. the Los Angeles Dodgers and San Diego Padres at Petco Park in San Diego, California, with the game tied 2–2 in the bottom of the 12th, the Padres loaded the bases with one out. With pull hitter Seth Smith at the plate, the Dodgers elected to play with 5 infielders, bringing in outfielder Andre Ethier to be the 5th man. In an unusual instance, they had 4 men play on the right side of the infield, and it paid off, as pitcher Kevin Correia would get Smith to hit a ground ball to the right side with a force at the plate, preventing the run from scoring. The Padres ended up winning the game on the very next batter, as Yasmani Grandal singled home Yangervis Solarte with the typical 4 man infield for the game winner.

== See also ==
- Baseball positioning
