= Comparison of Major League Baseball and Nippon Professional Baseball =

Major League Baseball (MLB) and Nippon Professional Baseball (NPB) are the highest levels of baseball in the United States and Japan, respectively. MLB started in 1876, while NPB was not formed until 1950, following reorganization of the Japanese Baseball League, which had been in existence since 1936. Though ostensibly the same game, baseball, is played in both MLB and NPB there are a number of differences between the game in the two organizations.

== Game rules ==
The NPB rules are essentially those of the American Major League Baseball (MLB), but technical elements are slightly different.

=== Ball ===
MLB uses a standardized ball manufactured by Rawlings. Its seams are rather flat, and it is prepared for use by rubbing it with a special mud to reduce the slipperiness of the new leather. For a long period there was no standard ball in NPB, but currently a standard ball manufactured by Mizuno is used across all teams in the league. The NPB ball is slightly smaller (8.875–9.125 inches (22.54–23.18 cm)) than its MLB equivalent (9–9.25 inches (22.9–23.5 cm)) and has better grip, making it easier to manipulate and spin.

=== Field ===
The NPB uses a smaller strike zone, and playing field. The strike zone is narrower "inside" than away from the batter. Five NPB teams have fields whose small dimensions would violate the American Official Baseball Rules. The note set out at the end of Rule 1.04 specifies minimum dimensions for American ballparks built or renovated after 1958: 325 feet (99 m) down each foul line and 400 feet (120 m) to center field. Though this rule is not rigidly enforced in MLB either, where, for example, Yankee Stadium was built after 1958, opening in 2009, and does not comply with the rule, having a distance down the right field line of 314 ft (96 m) and down the left field line of 318 ft (97 m).

=== Ties ===
Unlike North American baseball, Japanese baseball games may end in a tie. If the score is tied after nine innings of play, up to three additional innings will be played; this includes the playoffs, and postseason games up to Game 7 of the Japan Series. Historically, with day games, the limit was sunset or four hours. In the Japan Series, since 1967 a formal time limit of 4 hours, 30 minutes was used for all games until 1986. The game would be played until the conclusion of the current inning at the end of the time limit. From 1987 to 1993, the rule was 18 innings. From 1994 to 2018, the rule became 15 innings. Since 2019, the Japan Series rules are identical to the regular season, except in 2020 and 2021, where three extra innings would be played (there was no extra innings played in those two seasons).

If there is no winner after 12 innings, the game is declared a tie; these games count as neither a win nor a loss to team standings or to postseason series, except in the Climax Series, the first two rounds of the NPB playoffs, where a tie helps the higher-seeded team. In the best-of-three first round between the second and third seeds, if the second-seeded team has a win already, and the two teams tie in the second or third game, the second-seeded team advances since the third-seeded team needs two wins, while the second-seeded team needs two wins or one win and one tie. In the second round, a best-of-six series where the first seeded team needs only to win three games and the winner of the first round needs to win four games, if the first-seeded team has won two games, and it is the third game or further, and a tie game occurs, the first-seeded team wins the series since it is mathematically impossible for the first-round winner to win four games.

In the Japan Series, if neither team has won four games after Game 7 was played, there is no limit to innings or time limit starting with Game 8, and since 2021, the two-runner tiebreaker as prescribed by the international regulations (runners on first and second base) is used starting in the 13th inning.

== League format ==
MLB teams typically play 162 games in the regular season, while NPB teams typically play 143.

The end-of-season championship in MLB is the World Series, a best-of-seven competition in which a team must win four games to clinch the title. NPB's championship is the Japan Series, also a best-of-seven competition. However, since games can end in a tie, it may take more than seven games to decide the series. If the series must be extended, all games beyond Game 7 are played with no innings limit, with Game 8 being played in the same venue as Game 7, and Game 9 and beyond played in the opposing team's venue following a moving day. A Game 8 has only happened once in Japan Series history, in the 1986 Japan Series between the Hiroshima Toyo Carp and Seibu Lions.

== Rosters ==
MLB teams have 26-man active rosters, drawn from a larger 40-man roster of players under contract with the club. Players on the 40-man roster who are not on the active roster are typically either players currently on the injured list (or other temporary inactive list) or are assigned to the team's Triple-A minor league affiliate.

Although each NPB team roster has 28 players, there is a 25-player limit for each game. Managers scratch three players before each game, typically including the most recent starting pitcher.

Most NPB teams have a six-man starting pitcher rotation while MLB teams feature five-man rotations.

== Gameplay ==
Unlike association football, which uses arithmetic coefficients to compare and rank the competitiveness of different leagues, no such system exists for club-level professional baseball. American MLB players, scouts, and sabermetricians have described play in the NPB as "AAAA" or "Quad-A"; less competitive than in MLB, but more competitive than in Triple-A. However, some commentators have pushed back on this characterization in recent years, suggesting that the talent level in NPB varies, with many active players who would be successful on the MLB level.

Japanese baseball is generally considered more of a contact-oriented game than American baseball; it has been said that Japanese teams practice "small ball" rather than hitting for power. However, this was questioned by FanGraphs analyst Eno Sarris in 2017, who noted that contact rates in MLB are comparable to those in NPB.

In addition, Japanese teams practice much more often than American teams; the game relies more on off-speed pitching and not as many fastballs, and team harmony is stressed over individual achievements. As American journalist Robert Whiting wrote in his 1977 book The Chrysanthemum and the Bat, "the Japanese view of life, stressing group identity, cooperation, hard work, respect for age, seniority and 'face' has permeated almost every aspect of the sport.... Baseball Samurai Style is different."

Baseball in the United States has been described as offensive while in Japan it is defensive. Because of the relative strength of pitching in the Japanese league, some have suggested that batting and fielding statistics are more influential in differentiating successful NPB teams from unsuccessful ones.

== See also ==
- American expatriate baseball players in Japan
- List of Major League Baseball players from Japan
