= Blocking the plate =

Baseball technique

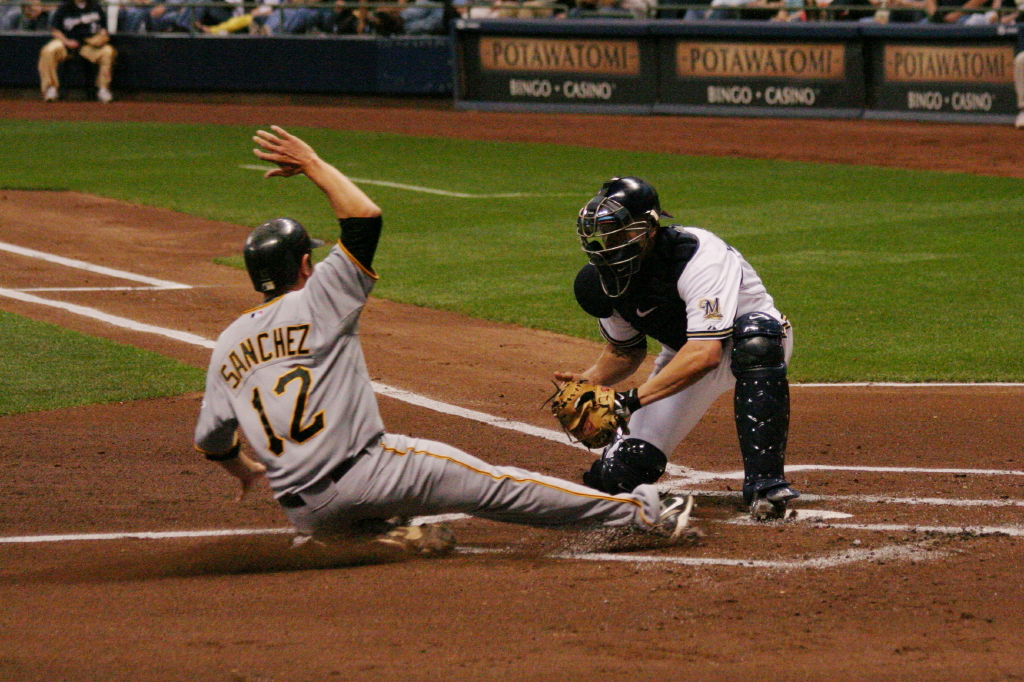
A catcher attempts to block a baserunner from reaching home plate

In baseball, blocking the plate is a technique performed by a catcher to prevent a runner from scoring. The act of blocking the plate accounted for most of the physical contact in Major League Baseball prior to the 2014 season, when it was outlawed except when the catcher already has possession of the ball.

By the rules of baseball, a runner has the right to an unobstructed path to a base. However, this right is not granted if the fielder guarding the base possesses the ball or is in the process of catching the ball. The fielders guarding the first base through the third base are unlikely to risk physical harm and will generally place themselves out of the path of the runner. The catcher guarding home plate, however, wears the padding and a face mask and often placed his body as an obstacle between the runner and home plate, even prior to receiving the ball. Since the runner did not have to worry about remaining on home plate, only tagging it, he typically ran at full speed in an effort to reach the plate. The speed of the runner combined with the fact that the catcher still had to tag him (unless the bases were loaded and a force play at home was still available) often resulted in collisions.

Since the 1970 Major League Baseball All-Star Game (when Ray Fosse was injured in a collision at the plate by Pete Rose), there have been rules established, mainly in amateur levels of baseball, against home plate collisions between runners and catchers to make the obstruction (defense) and interference (offense) rules consistent at the plate with the three bases. The rules, long enforced at lower levels, were implemented at the professional level in 2014.

== Technique ==
Any time there is a close play at home plate, meaning the ball and runner reach the plate at roughly the same time, the catcher will often squat in front of the plate to block the runner's clear path to the plate. Unless he is willing to be tagged out, the runner who is faced with a blocked plate has two choices. He can:

1. Attempt to slide around the catcher and avoid being tagged, or,
2. Collide with the catcher with such force that the catcher loses possession of the ball.

If the runner slides, the catcher will often make a sweeping motion with his glove to quickly tag the runner out. Otherwise, the catcher must brace for impact and keep the ball in his glove or hand in order to tag the runner out.

== Risk ==
Both players place themselves at risk of injury when there is a close play at home plate. Though they wear protective equipment, catchers are more likely to be injured than runners. Catchers often have bad knees due to the squatting stance they take at the plate. A catcher's knees are also his closest body parts to an incoming runner, and there is a chance of an ACL injury to the catcher. Other injuries include broken bones, bruises, and concussions.

In one infamous incident, Cleveland Indians catcher Ray Fosse suffered a separated shoulder when Pete Rose intentionally collided with him on a play at the plate during the 1970 Major League Baseball All-Star Game. Rose was roundly criticized because the game was an exhibition and also because he could have easily slid around Fosse rather than collide with him. Ultimately, the incident served to help build Rose's "Charlie Hustle" reputation and Fosse, who had been having a phenomenal rookie season, was never quite the same after the play.

== Rule differences by level ==
Different levels of baseball have instituted different rules in regards to collisions at home plate or on the bases, in part because of the Fosse-Rose collision and other instances where athletes have been injured or suffered concussions as a result of violent contact between runner and fielder.

In high school, the "malicious contact" rule prevents collisions at home plate or elsewhere on the field. The defense is prohibited from initiating flagrant contact with the base runner while the offense, in turn, is required to attempt to avoid significant contact, often through the use of a slide. If the defense violates, the ball is dead and the offender ejected as the umpire awards penalties that in his/her judgment will nullify the act of malicious contact. If the offense violates, the ball is dead, the offender is declared out and then ejected from the game.

In college, the "flagrant collision" rule discourages, but does not prohibit, collisions at home plate and on the bases. Instead, only "unnecessary and violent" collisions are outlawed. While defensive players are allowed to block the plate/base with clear possession of the ball, offensive players must take steps to ensure contact with the fielder is legal—for instance, it must be below the waist. Violations of this rule carry similar penalties to the high school malicious contact rule.

In Major League Baseball, collisions at the home plate have been legal and were unaddressed since the game's inception until a series of serious player injuries and also former catchers who were MLB managers recommending changes. In 2011, San Francisco catcher Buster Posey suffered a season-ending injury in a collision at home plate. The incident led to a reinterpretation of Rule 7.08 (b). On December 11, 2013, the MLB Rules Committee proposed a rules change that would outlaw the plate collision by dictating what both the defensive and offensive players may and may not do in such a situation. This establishes home plate with similar regulations as other bases in regards to obstruction (for the catcher) and interference (for the runner). On February 24, 2014, Major League Baseball and the MLBPA jointly announced an experimental rule—rule 7.13—intended to increase player safety by eliminating "egregious" collisions at home plate. The rule went into effect starting with the 2014 season but starting in 2015 the rule was renumbered as rule 6.01 (i). Informally known as the "Buster Posey Rule," some highlights of rule 7.13 include:

- A runner may not run out of a direct line to the plate in order to initiate contact with the catcher, or any player, covering the plate. If he does, the umpire can call him out even if the player taking the throw loses possession of the ball.
- The catcher may not block the pathway of a runner attempting to score unless he has possession of the ball. If the catcher blocks the runner before he has the ball, the umpire may call the runner safe.
- All calls will be based on the umpire's judgment. The umpire will consider such factors as whether the runner made an effort to touch the plate and whether he lowered his shoulder or used his hands, elbows or arms when approaching the catcher.
- Runners are not required to slide, and catchers in possession of the ball are allowed to block the plate. However, runners who do slide and catchers who provide the runner with a lane will never be found in violation of the rule.
- The expanded instant replay rules, which also went into effect in 2014, are available to review potential violations of Rule 7.13.

In Finnish baseball, the runner is considered tagged and out when he has not arrived at a target base and the defending player is holding the ball while touching that base, similar to force out. No physical contact is necessary and the base umpire will call the runner out by raising a sign with the letter X and whistling twice.

== Enforcing Rule 7.13 ==
Text of rule 7.13 is as follows:

A runner attempting to score may not deviate from his direct pathway to the plate in order to initiate contact with the catcher (or other player covering home plate). If, in the judgment of the Umpire, a runner attempting to score initiates contact with the catcher (or other player covering home plate) in such a manner, the Umpire shall declare the runner out (even if the player covering home plate loses possession of the ball).

Unless the catcher is in possession of the ball, the catcher cannot block the pathway of the runner as he is attempting to score. If, in the judgment of the Umpire, the catcher, without possession of the ball, blocks the pathway of the runner, the Umpire shall call or signal the runner safe.

Notwithstanding the above, it shall not be considered a violation of this Rule 7.13 if the catcher blocks the pathway of the runner in order to field a throw, and the Umpire determines that the catcher could not have fielded the ball without blocking the pathway of the runner and that contact with the runner was unavoidable.

The decision on whether or not a player violated Rule 7.13 falls into the hands of the umpire. A manager can choose to see if there was a rule violation rather than challenge a call, which might lead to a free challenge. The umpire makes the final decision.

== Response to Rule 7.13 ==
Some managers reacted by saying that they hoped the new rule does not decide the final game in the World Series. Many managers stated that the rule needed clarification and explanation. The rule depends on the perception of the umpire and if he or she thinks that the contact was intentional and done with malicious intent. Regardless of what the rule states, many managers instruct players to slide.
