= Infield shift =

Defensive realignment of players in baseball

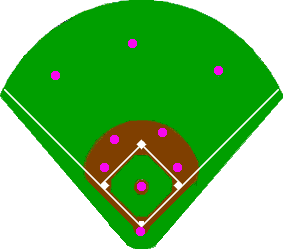
Traditional baseball defensive positioning; note the two infielders on each side of second base

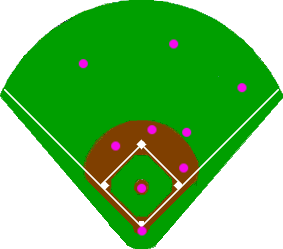
Baseball defensive positioning using a shift; note there is only one infielder to the left side of second base

The infield shift in baseball is a defensive realignment from the standard positions, to place more fielders on one side of the field or another. Used primarily against left-handed batters, it is designed to protect against base hits pulled hard into the gaps between the fielders on one side. Originally called the Williams shift, it has periodically been referred to as the Boudreau shift or Ortiz shift since then. After shifts became very effective in reducing base hits by Major League Baseball (MLB) batters, MLB and the Major League Baseball Players Association (MLBPA) agreed to begin restricting shifts starting in the 2023 season.

== History in Major League Baseball ==
The infield shift strategy is often associated with Ted Williams, yet was first employed against Cy Williams during the 1920s. Cy Williams, a left-handed outfielder with the Chicago Cubs and Philadelphia Phillies, was second only to Babe Ruth in major league career home runs from 1923 to 1928. Opposing defenses would shift "practically to the entire right side" when he batted.

The shift was used by Cleveland Indians manager Lou Boudreau between games of a doubleheader in July 1946 to halt Ted Williams' hot hitting. (Note: Boudreau writes that Williams had three home runs in the first game of the doubleheader, which corresponds to July 14, 1946, as Williams was 4-for-5 with three home runs in the first game of a doubleheader between Boston and Cleveland that day. Boudreau does not mention that even with the shift, Williams was 1-for-2 with two walks in the second game of the doubleheader. Contemporary reporting also notes that Boudreau actually employed shifts against Williams in both games of the doubleheader, with the shift in the second game being more radical.) The shift was later used against Williams during the 1946 World Series, as a defensive gimmick by St. Louis Cardinals manager Eddie Dyer to psych out and hopefully contain the Boston slugger. In his book Player-Manager, Boudreau later wrote, "I have always regarded the Boudreau Shift as a psychological, rather than a tactical, victory."

The shift has subsequently been employed to thwart extreme pull hitters (mostly those batting left-handed), such as Barry Bonds, Fred McGriff, Ryan Howard, Jason Giambi, David Ortiz, Jim Thome, Adam Dunn, Mark Teixeira, Matt Carpenter, Joey Gallo, and Anthony Rizzo.

== Implementing the shift ==
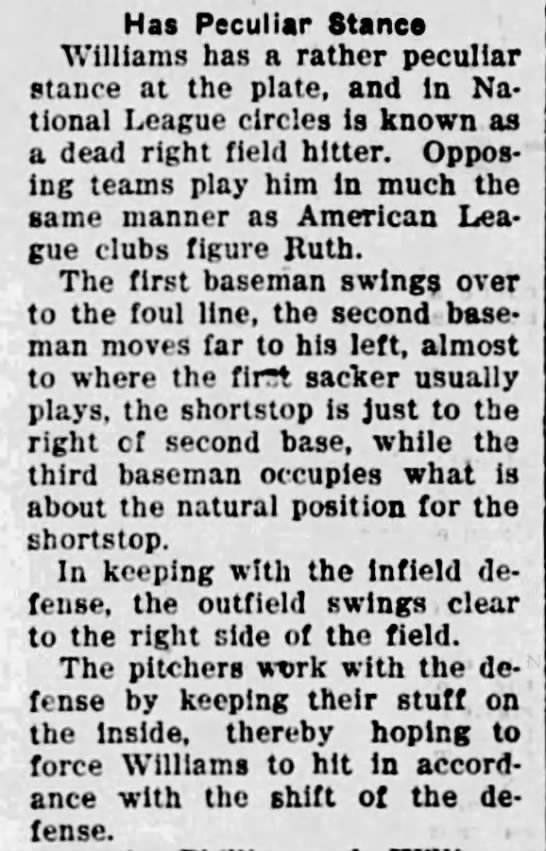
A May 1923 description of how teams implemented a shift against Cy Williams of the Philadelphia Phillies

In a typical shift against a left-handed hitter, the third baseman moves to their left where the shortstop plays; the shortstop plays to the right of second base; the second baseman plays between first and second base, and usually out on the grass in shallow right field; the center fielder plays in right-center; and the first baseman and right fielder hug the foul line. Sometimes, the third baseman, rather than the shortstop, will play to the right of second base, allowing the shortstop (who is usually the team's best infielder) to remain near their usual position.

=== Ortiz Shift ===
An extreme example of the infield shift is that used against left-handed designated hitter David Ortiz. The shortstop and second baseman move to the outfield between first base and second base while the left fielder and center fielder are moved towards the right side of the field with the third baseman going to the left side of the outfield.

Joe Maddon, as manager of the Tampa Bay Devil Rays, had an upcoming series against the Boston Red Sox in 2006 and was considering a strategy on how to defend against Ortiz. Maddon was cycling on an exercise bike as he looked at Ortiz's sabermetrics and noticed that Ortiz mostly hit to right field and the majority of those hits landed in the outfield. Maddon created the Ortiz Shift to counter it. The shift was first used in the Devil Rays' 7–4 loss to the Red Sox on April 18, 2006 at Fenway Park. Though Ortiz was 2-for-5 in that game, the tactic was successful and a number of other clubs employed it against Ortiz, with his batting average dropping from .300 over 2004–2006 to .265 midway through the 2006 season.

Baseball historian Bill James—who worked for the Red Sox at the time—criticized the Ortiz shift as only working for ground balls and not for home runs, which he described as Ortiz's true danger. Though the shift was mostly used against Ortiz, it has been used elsewhere in baseball.

== Defensive vulnerability ==
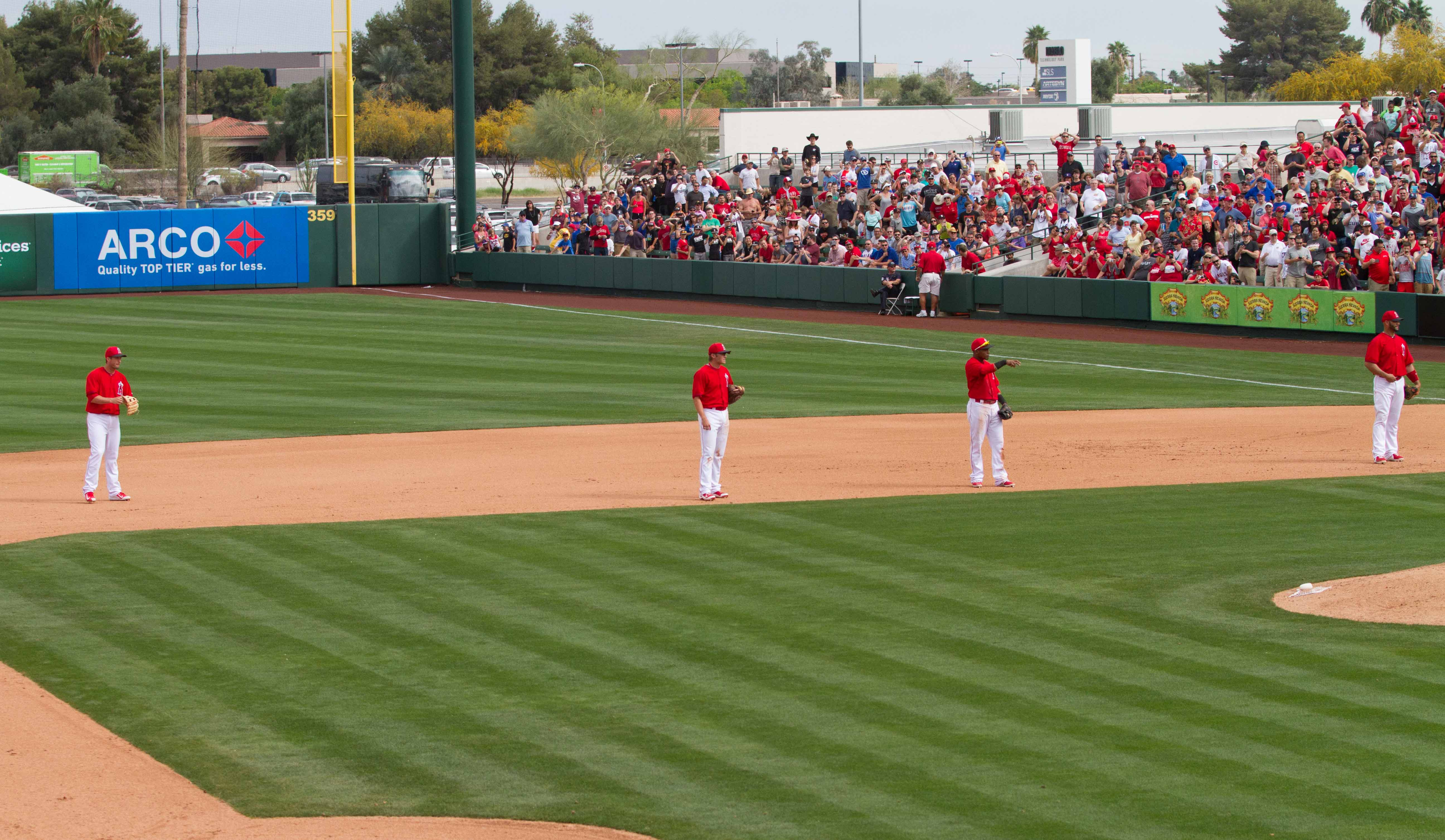
An infield shift by the Los Angeles Angels during spring training in 2015

As the infield shift leaves some areas less covered than others, a batter who hits toward those areas may obtain better results than against an un-shifted infield. For example, a batter can bunt towards third base, when the third baseman is positioned elsewhere. Boston's Ortiz started to hit more balls towards the left side of the field, taking advantage of the lack of defenders in left field. A stark example occurred in a May 1970 game between the Philadelphia Phillies and the San Francisco Giants: Giant Willie McCovey bunted hard down the third base line when the shift was on. With no one covering third, Willie Mays, on first at the time, came all the way around to score, while McCovey reached second for a double. In a September 1946 game in Cleveland, Ted Williams came to bat with one out and a runner at first base, and Lou Boudreau had his defenders shift to the right side, leaving only left fielder Pat Seerey to the left of second base, positioned near the infield. Williams hit a long fly ball to left-center, "a routine out against an orthodox defense", but against the radical shift was uncaught and rolled to the wall, allowing him to record an inside-the-park home run, the only one of his career.

Infield shifts can also provide base running opportunities to the batting team. A notable example occurred in Game 4 of the 2009 World Series: with switch hitter Mark Teixeira of the New York Yankees batting left-handed, and the Philadelphia Phillies implementing an infield shift, baserunner Johnny Damon stole second base and then continued on to third base in one continuous play, as there was no fielder on the left side of the infield. Damon subsequently scored what proved to be the winning run of the game.

== Criticism ==
Shifts are criticized for increasing the percentage of hard-hit balls that result in outs, thus reducing batting averages and baserunners, resulting in a "less entertaining" fan experience. A 2022 analysis by Tom Verducci found that, for Major League Baseball, "Over the past seven years, shifts more than tripled and they reduced batting average on hard-hit grounders by 80 points!" Verducci further opined:

Since 2019, shifts changed how the game looked and how it was played. They made the game aesthetically awkward and less entertaining, which is why a rule change was needed: to rebalance the entertainment value of baseball against its brutish efficiency. In the blend of art and science, baseball should always be more about an athletic competition than an intellectual contest among hackers.

It was also noted that the advanced statistic batting average on balls in play (BABIP—how often batted balls result in hits, excluding home runs) had declined in MLB from .300 in 2016 to .290 in 2022. Restricting the shift was expected (by MLB) to allow for more base hits and baserunners, thus providing a "more attractive product" to fans.

== Regulation ==
As early as 2015, the Commissioner of Baseball considered banning the shift, with some MLB managers expressing agreement, although there was no consensus on such an idea. In 2019, the independent Atlantic League of Professional Baseball, as part of an agreement with MLB to test experimental rules, significantly restricted the shift by requiring two infielders to be positioned on either side of second base.

As part of a new collective bargaining agreement (CBA) reached after the 2021–22 lockout, MLB agreed to regulate infield shifts starting with the 2023 season, with the league's 11-member competition committee empowered to approve such a change, along with other potential changes such as a pitch clock. In Minor League Baseball during 2022, shift restrictions were tested at the Double-A and Class A levels (four players required to be in the infield, two on each side of second base) with a further experiment in the Florida State League starting in July (a wedge-shaped exclusion area around second base).

In 2023, a new rule was added in Major League Baseball requiring two infielders to be positioned on either side of second base, and all four infielders to be positioned with both feet on the infield dirt, before each pitch is thrown, in an attempt to curtail the shift. MLB explained the change by noting "these restrictions will return the game to a more traditional aesthetic by governing defensive shifts, with the goals of encouraging more balls in play, giving players more opportunities to showcase their athleticism, and offsetting the growing trend of alignments that feature four outfielders.”

The rule was further modified in 2025: if an infielder violates the shift rule and is the first fielder to touch the ball during a play, the batter is given first base, all runners are allowed to advance one base, and the violator is charged with an error. As before, the batting team can decline the penalty and accept the result of the play. This new rule came into play on September 18, 2025, when Kansas City Royals second baseman Michael Massey fielded a ground ball by the Seattle Mariners' Dominic Canzone and threw to first base to retire Canzone. Mariners manager Dan Wilson challenged the play, and on review Massey was found to have had his heels on the outfield grass when the pitch was delivered. Canzone was awarded first base and Massey was charged with an error. This was believed to be the first time an error had been charged on a shift violation.

However, there are no restriction to infield shifts in WBSC rulebook.

== See also ==
- Baseball positioning
- Fielding restrictions (cricket)
