= Official rules of Major League Baseball =

North American professional rules

The Official Rules of Major League Baseball is a set of rules set forth by the MLB governing the playing of baseball games by professional teams of Major League Baseball and the leagues that are members of the National Association of Professional Baseball Leagues. The rules specify the equipment used and its care and preparation, the layout of the playing field, the details of game play, and the expected behavior of the players.

The rules are also used by many amateur leagues, although in these cases, the monetary fines and other such stipulation are usually considered impractical and disregarded.

== History ==
Starting with the Knickerbocker Rules in 1845, and the National League Rules in 1877, the rules of baseball have evolved over time. The 2014 edition of the rulebook fills about 250 pages. After the 2014 season, the Playing Rules Committee reorganized and recodified the rules. However, through the 2017 edition, the rulebook also contains a listing in the 2014 format. The 2017 edition occupies 163 and 99 pages in the updated and 2014 formats, respectively.

Changes to the rules are decided by a committee. Although new rules are added, some rules which are obsolete have not been deleted. In recent years the rules have also been posted online.

== See also ==
- Baseball rules
