= Obstruction (baseball) =

Foul in baseball

In baseball, obstruction is when a fielder illegally hinders a baserunner running within the basepath. Baserunners are generally permitted to run from base to base without being physically blocked or hindered by a fielder. The only time that a fielder is not obligated to "get out of the way" of a baserunner is when the fielder is fielding a hit ball or in possession of the ball.

== Definition ==
Official Baseball Rule 2.00 defines obstruction as:

The act of a fielder who, while not in possession of the ball and not in the act of fielding the ball, impedes the progress of any runner. Comment: If a fielder is about to receive a thrown ball and if the ball is in flight directly toward and near enough to the fielder so he must occupy his position to receive the ball he may be considered "in the act of fielding a ball." It is entirely up to the judgment of the umpire as to whether a fielder is in the act of fielding a ball. After a fielder has made an attempt to field a ball and missed, he can no longer be in the "act of fielding" the ball. For example: an infielder dives at a ground ball and the ball passes him and he continues to lie on the ground and delays the progress of the runner, he very likely has obstructed the runner.

The comment to Rule 7.09(j) adds that

[o]bstruction by a fielder attempting to field a ball should be called only in very flagrant and violent cases because the rules give him the right of way, but of course such right of way is not a license to, for example, intentionally trip a runner even though fielding the ball.

High school and college versions of the rule also add rules against malicious or flagrant contact.

== Types of obstruction and corresponding penalties ==
Any case of obstruction falls into one of two categories (formerly called type "A" and type "B" until the 2014 rewriting of the MLB Umpire rulebook), after the subsection of Rule 6.01(h), in which each type of obstruction, and the corresponding penalties, are described.

(1)

If a play is being made on the obstructed runner, or if the batter-runner is obstructed before he touches first base, the ball is dead and all runners shall advance, without liability to be put out, to the bases they would have reached, in the umpire’s judgment, if there had been no obstruction. The obstructed runner shall be awarded at least one base beyond the base he had last legally touched before the obstruction. Any preceding runners, forced to advance by the award of bases as the penalty for obstruction, shall also advance without liability to be put out.

(2)

If no play is being made on the obstructed runner, the play shall proceed until no further action is possible. The umpire shall then call “Time” and impose such penalties, if any, as in his judgment will nullify the act of obstruction.

In addition, the fielder who commits the obstruction is charged with an fielding error. As with a catcher's interference call, if the obstruction allows the batter to safely reach first base, unlike other fielding errors the batter is not charged with an at bat.

== Common misconceptions ==
There need not be physical contact for obstruction to be called; if a fielder causes the runner to alter his normal running path, or deliberately blocks his view of the plate, he can be guilty of obstruction.

Obstruction is not the same as interference; obstruction is committed by a fielder against a base runner, while interference, with the exception of catcher's interference, is committed by a baserunner against a fielder or a batter against a catcher. When a fielder hinders a base runner, baseball commentators (including the announcers of the 2013 game discussed below) will often mistakenly refer to obstruction as interference.

== Notable cases of obstruction ==
On August 6, 2004, a game between the Seattle Mariners and the Tampa Bay Devil Rays at Tropicana Field ended with a Devil Rays victory on an obstruction call. With one out and the score tied 1–1 in the bottom of the tenth inning, the Devil Rays' Carl Crawford was taking a lead off of third base when Tino Martinez hit a fly ball toward Mariners left fielder Raúl Ibañez. Crawford went back to third base as if he was going to consider tagging up and trying to score after the ball was caught. Mariners shortstop José López moved to a spot that was between Crawford and Ibañez. Ibañez caught the ball, and Crawford bluffed a run toward home; he then stopped and was heading back toward third base as Ibañez's throw sailed toward home plate. However, third base umpire Paul Emmel ruled that López had blocked Crawford's view of left fielder Ibañez, thus preventing Crawford from seeing when the ball was caught and when he could leave third base and head toward home plate. Emmel called obstruction on the ground that López's action, within the language of the rule, had "impede[d] the progress of" Crawford by not letting him see precisely when it was safe for him to leave the base. Emmel awarded Crawford home plate, and that was the winning run. The play involved "Type A" obstruction, as a play was being made on Crawford at the time of the obstruction because Ibañez threw the ball home to prevent him from scoring. The play also demonstrated how it is not necessary for a fielder to make physical contact with a runner or physically impede the runner's running path to be called for obstruction.

On October 4, 2003, in Game 3 of the 2003 American League Division Series between the Oakland A's and the Red Sox, the A's Miguel Tejada was called out after he apparently misunderstood the obstruction rule. Tejada was on second base when teammate Ramón Hernández hit a ground ball into left field for a hit. Tejada rounded third and collided with Red Sox third baseman Bill Mueller, who was trying to get into position to receive a throw from left fielder Manny Ramirez. Umpire Bill Welke called obstruction. Incorrectly thinking that the play was over and that he was entitled to home plate automatically, Tejada slowed to a jog and headed toward home. The Red Sox, however, threw the ball to catcher Jason Varitek who caught the ball long before Tejada reached home and easily tagged him out. Tejada had failed to realize that, because a play was not being made on him at the time of Mueller's obstruction, the obstruction was "Type B" obstruction. Therefore, under Rule 7.06(b), Welke's call was only preliminary, the ball was still live, and the play was supposed to "proceed until no further action [was] possible," at which point the umpires would judge whether Tejada would have scored if the obstruction had not occurred. Tejada was called out after Varitek tagged him with the live ball because, in light of his jogging, the umpires could not say that he would have scored if the obstruction had not occurred.

On October 26, 2013, Game 3 of the 2013 World Series was decided by an obstruction call. In the bottom of the ninth inning, Allen Craig of the St. Louis Cardinals was impeded by Boston Red Sox third-baseman Will Middlebrooks, who had fallen to the ground trying to catch a wild throw from Red Sox catcher Jarrod Saltalamacchia. As a result, the third-base umpire, Jim Joyce, ruled obstruction, and thus Craig was awarded home plate and the Cardinals won the game 5–4. This play involved "Type B" obstruction, because no play was being made on Craig at the time that the obstruction occurred. Saltalamacchia's throw had already gone into left field before Craig tripped over Middlebrooks's body while trying to head home.

The difference between the play on Tejada and the play that ended Game 3 of the 2013 World Series was that, in the 2013 game, Allen Craig got up after he tripped over Middlebrooks and ran hard toward home plate, where he was tagged by catcher Saltalamacchia just before he slid into the plate. Home plate umpire Dana DeMuth then made the final call that Craig was safe because he would have scored if Middlebrooks's obstruction had not occurred.

According to David Smith, baseball historian and founder of Retrosheet, as of October 2013, the 2004 and 2013 games described above were the only games that ever ended on an obstruction call.

== History ==
The rule against obstruction was first formalized as part of the 1856 version of the National Association of Base Ball Players rules. The current language of the Official Rules was introduced in 1962, and modified in 2019.

== See also ==
- Blocking the plate
- Interference
