= Pull hitter =

Type of batter

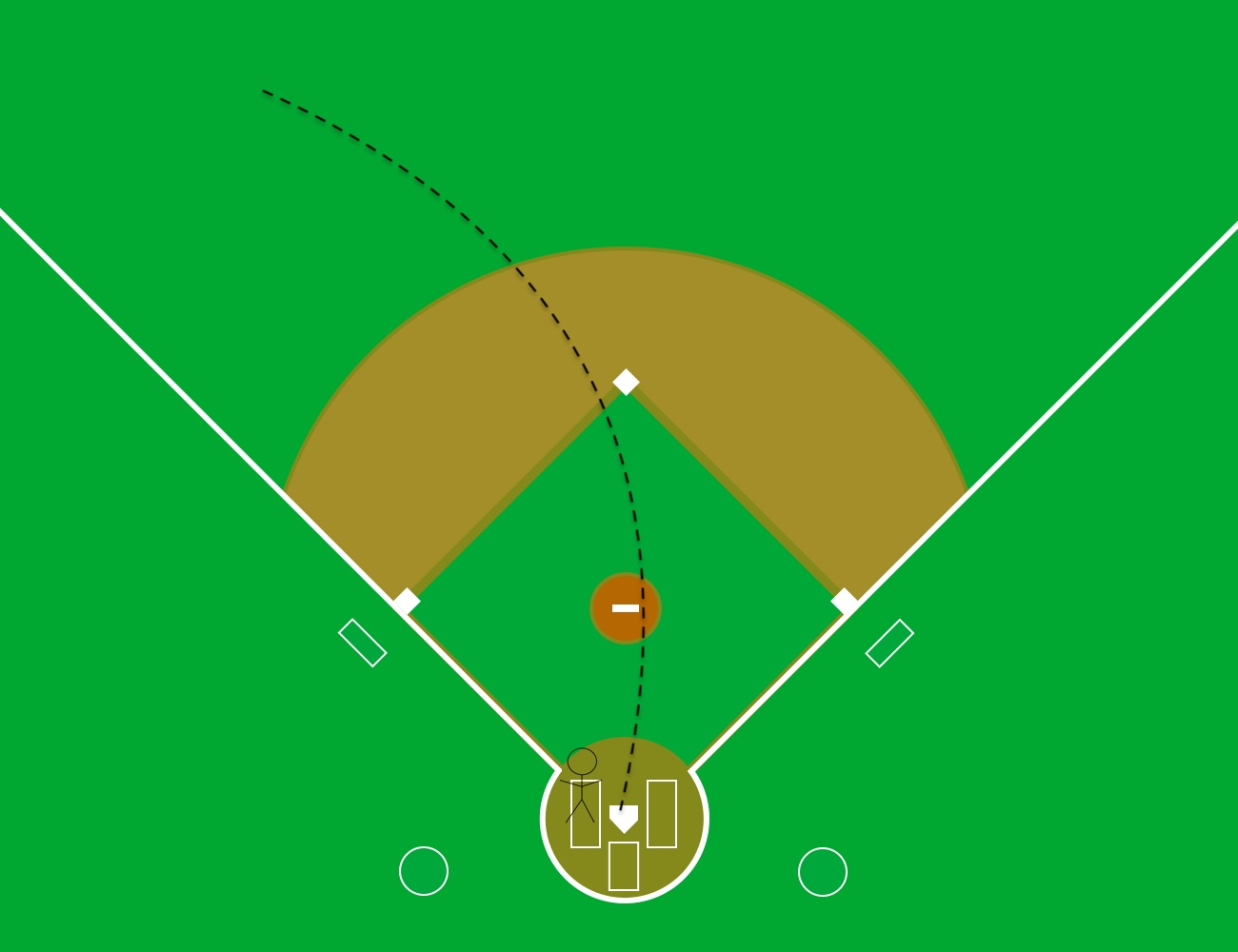
A right-handed batter pulls the ball to left field.

In baseball, a pull hitter is a batter who predominantly hits the ball to the side of the field from which they bat. They are also known as a puller.

== Definition ==
A right-handed hitter stands on the left side of home plate and "pulls" the ball by sending it to the left side of the diamond (between second and third base). A left-handed pull hitter, on the other hand, tends to hit the ball to the right side of the field (between first and second base). In general, pullers are meeting the ball earlier at the plate, making contact with the ball in front of their body.

If the ball goes to the right side from a right-handed hitter, it has gone to the "opposite field". Players who rarely hit to the opposite field or the middle are called dead pull hitters.

== History ==
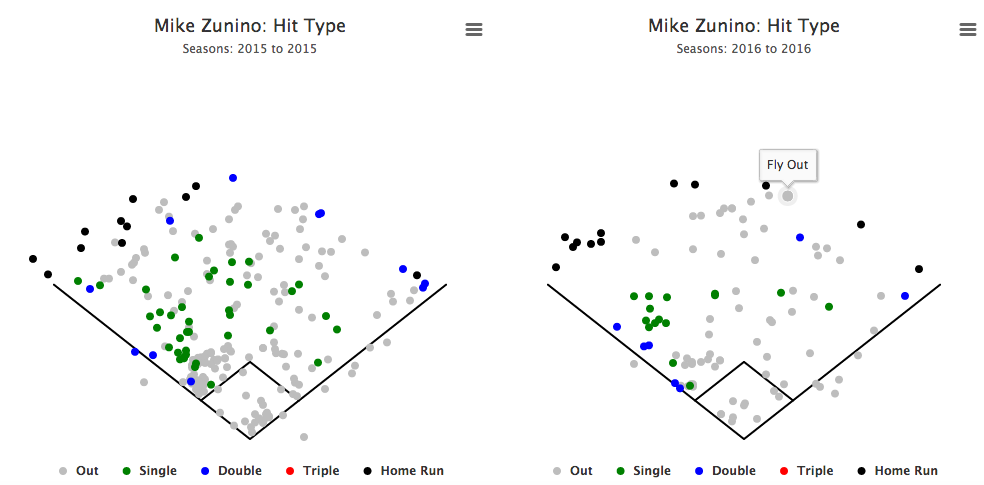
Spray chart for right-handed pull hitter Mike Zunino's 2015 season.

Baseball lexicographer Paul Dickson recorded a usage of "pull hitter" in a 1925 column by Chilly Doyle in the Pittsburgh Post-Gazette, "The Pirate catcher (Earl Smith) is one of the league's 'pull' hitters; that is, Earl, a lefthand batter of the slugging type, smashes most of his wallops to rightfield." The term was common by 1928 when Babe Ruth used it in Babe Ruth's Own Book of Baseball. In a section on "Correcting Batting Faults", he wrote, "Most fellows who can't hit curve balls are chaps who stride out of line or 'pull away' from the ball. Most batters who have trouble with slow ball pitching are 'pull' hitters. That is, they are meeting the ball 'out front.'"

Ted Williams wrote, "the ideal hit is a pulled ball 380 feet because that's a home run in most parks in the big leagues". Charley Lau explained, "the best pitch to pull is one thrown on the inner half of the plate", i.e. the side closest to the hitter. Rod Carew pointed out that trying to pull the ball reduces the hitting area by at least half.

The ability to hit the ball to anywhere on the field is an extremely valuable skill. Some of the sport's best hitters will pull inside pitches and hit outside pitches to the opposite field. Opposite field hitting is less often referred to as "pushing" the ball.

== Shifting ==
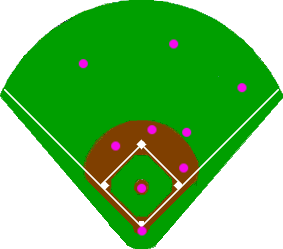
Defensive shift for a left-handed pull hitter where all fielders move to the right. The shortstop is on the right side of second base.

It is common for managers to implement the defensive tactic known as "shifting" for pull hitters, especially for left-handed batters. Players are moved to the side of the field where the pulled hit is likely to come. In 1923, defenses regularly shifted for Cy Williams, and throughout his career, Ted Williams faced the shift.

For a left-handed power hitter like Harold Baines, a full "shift" moves the third baseman to the shortstop's normal position. The shortstop shifts to shallow right field between the first and second basemen. The outfielders will also shift towards the right side of the field. Analysts found that when the shift is on, pitchers also tend to throw more to the inside to encourage pull hits.

As Sabermetrics developed, teams had more accurate information about batting tendencies, and they deployed the shift more frequently. In 2010, teams shifted 3,323 times. By 2017, the league was shifting 33,218 times a season. In 2023, Major League Baseball essentially banned the full shift by requiring two infielders on either side of second base before each pitch.

Despite the limit on true defensive shifts, MLB teams still "shade" left-handed pull hitters regularly, by sliding infielders to the right without crossing second base. 50.6% of 2025 at-bats by left-handed batters had out-of-position ("shaded") infielders. In the final season before the shift ban, 2022, 55% of left-handed at-bats were shifted. By comparison, shifts and shades are rarely used against right-handed batters; in 2022, 19.6% of right-handed at-bats were shifted, and in 2025, only 7.7% of right-handed at-bats were shaded.

== See also ==
- Baseball positioning
