= Baseball positioning =

Locations of players on a baseball field

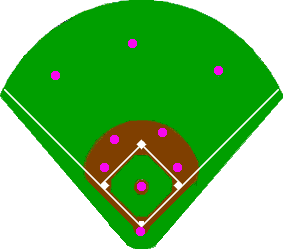
The dots represent normal depth and lateral positioning for the nine defensive players

In baseball and softball, while there are nine named fielding positions, players, with the exception of the pitcher and catcher, may move around freely. The positioning for the other seven positions is very flexible, although they all have regular depths—distances from home plate, and sometimes lateral positioning. A shift means that a player is playing in a noticeably different location than the norm for his positioning. A fielder who is playing shallow or in is playing closer to home plate, while a player playing deep is playing farther from home plate than normal.

== Common types of positioning ==
Regular terms are used for some positionings. For example, double play depth is used when there is potential for a force play at second base. This means the shortstop and second baseman are playing slightly closer to second base and sometimes a little bit shallower. This position makes it easier to turn the double play.

The first baseman is said to be holding the runner if he positions himself right at first base with one foot on the base, ready to receive a pickoff throw from the pitcher if the runner strays too far from first base between pitches.

Bringing the corners in means the first and third baseman are both playing in (closer than usual to home plate); this will often be used with runners at third base or when a bunt is anticipated.

The disadvantage of these defensive shifts is that they make more room for the hitter to hit the ball through the gaps for a base hit or lay down a successful bunt too far from any fielder to make a play resulting in an out.

Sometimes in the bottom half of the ninth inning (or later), when a team has a runner on third base in a tie game with less than two outs, the defending team will pull the outfielders in very close, almost creating three extra infielders. This is sometimes known as do or die depth. The reason for positioning this way in this situation is that there is no point in having the outfielders playing deep, waiting to catch a fly ball for an out; if they do, the runner at third base will be able to tag up when the ball is caught and then run to home plate to score the winning run. So the outfielders can contribute constructively only by filling the gaps between the infielders.

=== Infield shift ===
Some extreme repositioning known as a shift was used against pull hitters, a strategy that became more prevalent in Major League Baseball since the late-2000s. For example, versus excellent left-handed pull-hitters like Ted Williams, David Ortiz, Joey Gallo and Ryan Howard, teams would move more players to the right side of the field. They would sometimes play with the shortstop behind or even to the right of second base. The second baseman may simply move to the right, in which case this just qualifies as a shift, or he might move deeper into shallow right field. Another variation had the third baseman move to where the shortstop would play in the shift, leaving the shortstop (who is generally the team's best infielder) to cover the left side of the infield.

Many believe that this shift was first employed against Ted Williams in the 1940s, as thought up by then-Indians manager Lou Boudreau. However, it was first used against Cy Williams in the 1920s.

The infield shift was restricted by MLB beginning in the 2023 season.

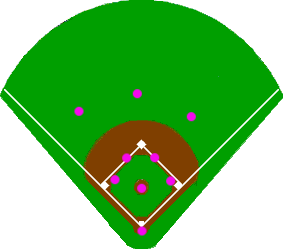
Infield and outfield in

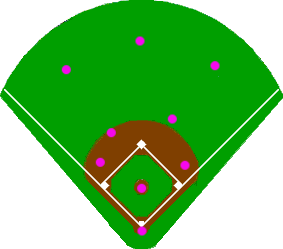
Infield deep

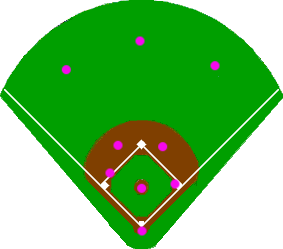
Double play depth

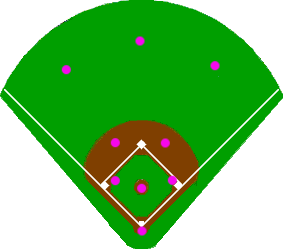
Corners in

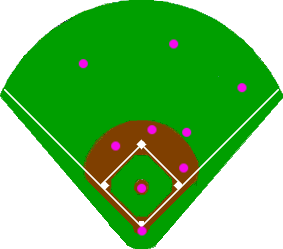
Left-handed pull-hitter shift, aka "overshift"

== See also ==
- Baseball#Strategy and tactics
