= Putout =

Statistic for a defensive baseball player

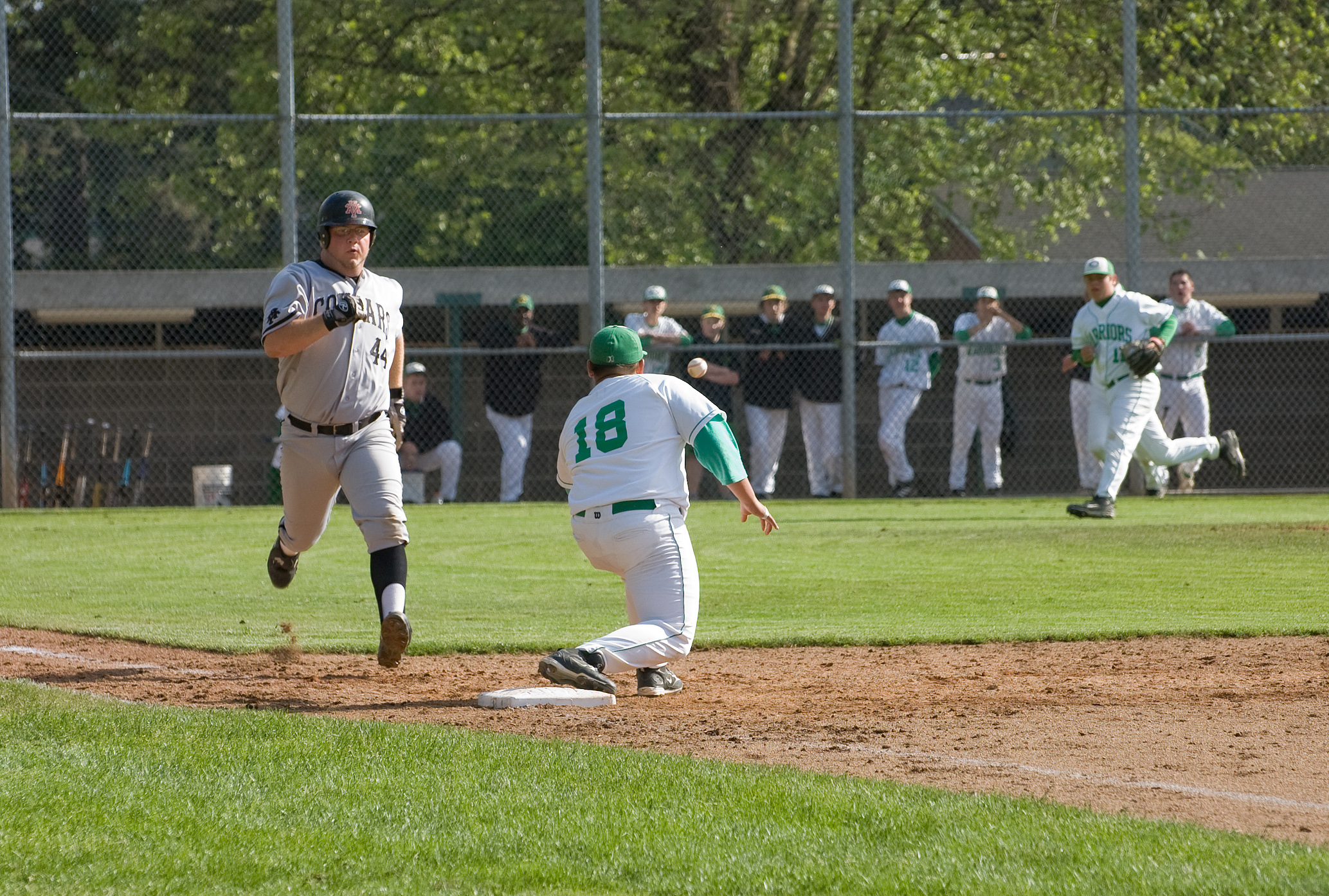
An attempted putout at first base.

In baseball statistics, a putout (PO) is awarded to a defensive player who (generally while in secure possession of the ball) records an out by one of the following methods:

- Tagging a runner with the ball when the runner is not touching a base (a tagout)
- Catching a batted ball on the fly (a flyout)
- Retrieving a batted ball hit along the ground which a defensive player subsequently throws to another defensive player who then catches it- the latter simultaneously occupying a base, or by subsequently touching a base while in possession of the ball- thus recording an out of a batter or runner, before the batter, or non-batting runner, can touch the base to which he is compelled to advance (a force out- referred to as a groundout if the player who has been put out is the batter-runner attempting to reach first base- or, if done after a flyout, a doubling off).
- Catching a thrown ball and tagging a base to record an out on an appeal play
- Catching a third strike (a strikeout)
- Being positioned closest to a runner called out for interference

In a regulation nine-inning game, the winning team will always have a total of 27 putouts, as one putout is awarded for every defensive out made; this is one aspect of proving a box score.

While the abbreviation for putout is "PO", baseball scorekeeping typically records the specific manner in which an out was achieved, without explicitly noting which player is awarded the putout for common plays. For example, a strikeout is recorded without noting the putout by the catcher, with additional detail only provided as needed. For example, "Fryman struck out (catcher to first)" in a play-by-play summary in reference to an out recorded following an uncaught third strike, which indicates the putout was credited to the first baseman rather than the catcher.

== All-time records ==
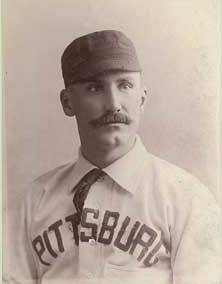
Jake Beckley, all-time career leader in putouts among major-league players

Content in this section has been updated through completion of the 2022 major-league season.

=== Career records ===
1. Jake Beckley: 23,767 (1888–1907)
2. Cap Anson: 22,572 (1871–1897)
3. Ed Konetchy: 21,378 (1907–1921)
4. Eddie Murray: 21,265 (1977–1997)
5. Charlie Grimm: 20,722 (1916–1936)
6. Stuffy McInnis: 20,120 (1909–1927)
7. Mickey Vernon: 19,819 (1939–1960)
8. Jake Daubert: 19,634 (1910–1924)
9. Lou Gehrig: 19,525 (1923–1939)
10. Joe Kuhel: 19,386 (1930–1947)

Note: each of the above players was primarily a first baseman.
Note: entering the 2023 season, Joey Votto has the most putouts among active MLB players, with 14,440.

=== Single season records ===
The most putouts recorded by any player in a single major-league season is 1,846 by Jiggs Donahue, a first baseman with the 1907 Chicago White Sox.

==== Pitchers ====
- 1. Dave Foutz: 57 (1886)
- 2. Tony Mullane: 54 (1882)
- 3. George Bradley: 50 (1876)
- 3. Guy Hecker: 50 (1884)
- 5. Mike Boddicker: 49 (1984)
- 6. Larry Corcoran: 47 (1884)
- 7. Ted Breitenstein: 46 (1895)
- 8. Al Spalding: 45 (1876)
- 9. Jim Devlin: 44 (1876)
- 9. Dave Foutz: 44 (1887)
- 9. Bill Hutchison: 44 (1890)

==== Catchers ====
- 1. Yasmani Grandal: 1,169 (Milwaukee Brewers, 2019)
- 2. J. T. Realmuto: 1,151 (Philadelphia Phillies, 2022)
- 3. Christian Vázquez: 1,136 (Boston Red Sox, 2021)
- 4. Johnny Edwards: 1,135 (Houston Astros, 1969)
- 5. Yasmani Grandal: 1,114 (Los Angeles Dodgers, 2018)
- 6. Yadier Molina: 1,113 (St. Louis Cardinals, 2016)
- 7. Will Smith: 1,101 (Los Angeles Dodgers, 2021)
- 8. J. T. Realmuto: 1,098 (Philadelphia Phillies, 2019)
- 9. Wilson Ramos: 1,094 (Washington Nationals, 2016)
- 10. Yasmani Grandal: 1,089 (Los Angeles Dodgers, 2017)

Note: as the majority of putouts by catchers occur on strikeouts, most single-season putout records for catchers have occurred in recent seasons (excepting the shortened 2020 season), consistent with the increase in total strikeouts per MLB season (for example; 42,104 in 2021 compared to 34,489 in 2011).

==== First basemen ====
- 1. Jiggs Donahue: 1,846 (1907)
- 2. George Kelly: 1,759 (1920)
- 3. Phil Todt: 1,755 (1926)
- 4. Wally Pipp: 1,710 (1926)
- 5. Jiggs Donahue: 1,697 (1906)
- 6. Candy LaChance: 1,691 (1904)
- 7. Tom Jones: 1,687 (1907)
- 8. Ernie Banks: 1,682 (1965)
- 9. Wally Pipp: 1,667 (1922)
- 10. Lou Gehrig: 1,662 (1927)

==== Second basemen ====
- 1. Bid McPhee: 529 (1886)
- 2. Bobby Grich: 484 (1974)
- 3. Bucky Harris: 483 (1922)
- 4. Nellie Fox: 478 (1956)
- 5. Lou Bierbauer: 472 (1889)
- 6. Billy Herman: 466 (1933)
- 7. Bill Wambsganss: 463 (1924)
- 8. Cub Stricker: 461 (1887)
- 9. Buddy Myer: 460 (1935)
- 10. Bill Sweeney: 459 (1912)

==== Third basemen ====
- 1. Denny Lyons: 255 (Philadelphia Athletics, 1887)
- 2. Jimmy Collins: 251 (Boston Beaneaters (NL), 1900)
- 2. Jimmy Williams: 251 (Pittsburgh Pirates, 1899)
- 4. Jimmy Collins: 243 (Boston Beaneaters (NL), 1898)
- 4. Willie Kamm: 243 (Chicago White Sox, 1928)
- 6. Willie Kamm: 236 (Chicago White Sox, 1927)
- 7. Home Run Baker: 233 (Philadelphia Athletics, 1913)
- 8. Bill Coughlin: 232 (Washington Senators, 1901)
- 9. Ernie Courtney: 229 (Philadelphia Phillies, 1905)
- 10. Jimmy Austin: 228 (St. Louis Browns, 1911)

==== Shortstops ====
- 1. Donie Bush: 425 (Detroit Tigers, 1914)
- 1. Hughie Jennings: 425 (Baltimore Orioles [NL], 1895)
- 3. Joe Cassidy: 408 (Washington Senators, 1905)
- 4. Rabbit Maranville: 407 (Boston Braves, 1914)
- 5. Dave Bancroft: 405 (New York Giants, 1922)
- 5. Eddie Miller: 405 (Boston Braves, 1940)
- 7. Monte Cross: 404 (Philadelphia Phillies, 1898)
- 8. Dave Bancroft: 396 (New York Giants, 1921)
- 9. Mickey Doolan: 395 (Philadelphia Phillies, 1906)
- 10. Buck Weaver: 392 (Chicago White Sox, 1913)

==== Left fielders ====
- 1. Joe Vosmik: 432 (1932)
- 2. Rickey Henderson: 412 (1980)
- 3. Gil Coan: 379 (1951)
- 4. Ben Oglivie: 377 (1980)
- 5. Bobby Veach: 370 (1921)
- 5. Gary Ward: 370 (1983)
- 7. Elmer Valo: 368 (1949)
- 8. Barry Bonds: 366 (1989)
- 8. Bobby Veach: 366 (1922)
- 10: Bibb Falk: 364 (1927)

==== Center fielders ====
- 1. Richie Ashburn: 532 (1951)
- 2. Taylor Douthit: 518 (1928)
- 3. Chet Lemon: 509 (1977)
- 4. Richie Ashburn: 501 (1949)
- 4. Dwayne Murphy: 501 (1980)
- 6. Richie Ashburn: 500 (1956)
- 7. Richie Ashburn: 499 (1957)
- 8. Richie Ashburn: 494 (1958)
- 9. Jim Busby: 492 (1954)
- 9. Andruw Jones: 492 (1999)

==== Right fielders ====
- 1. Dave Parker: 381 (1977)
- 1. Ichiro Suzuki: 381 (2005)
- 3. Babe Herman: 380 (1932)
- 4. Austin Kearns: 374 (2007)
- 4. Hunter Pence: 374 (2013)
- 6. Ichiro Suzuki: 372 (2004)
- 7. Mookie Betts: 366 (2017)
- 7. Dave Winfield: 366 (1977)
- 9. Jason Heyward: 365 (2014)
- 10. Jermaine Dye: 362 (1999)

== See also ==
- Assist (baseball)
