= Double play =

Making two outs during the same play in baseball

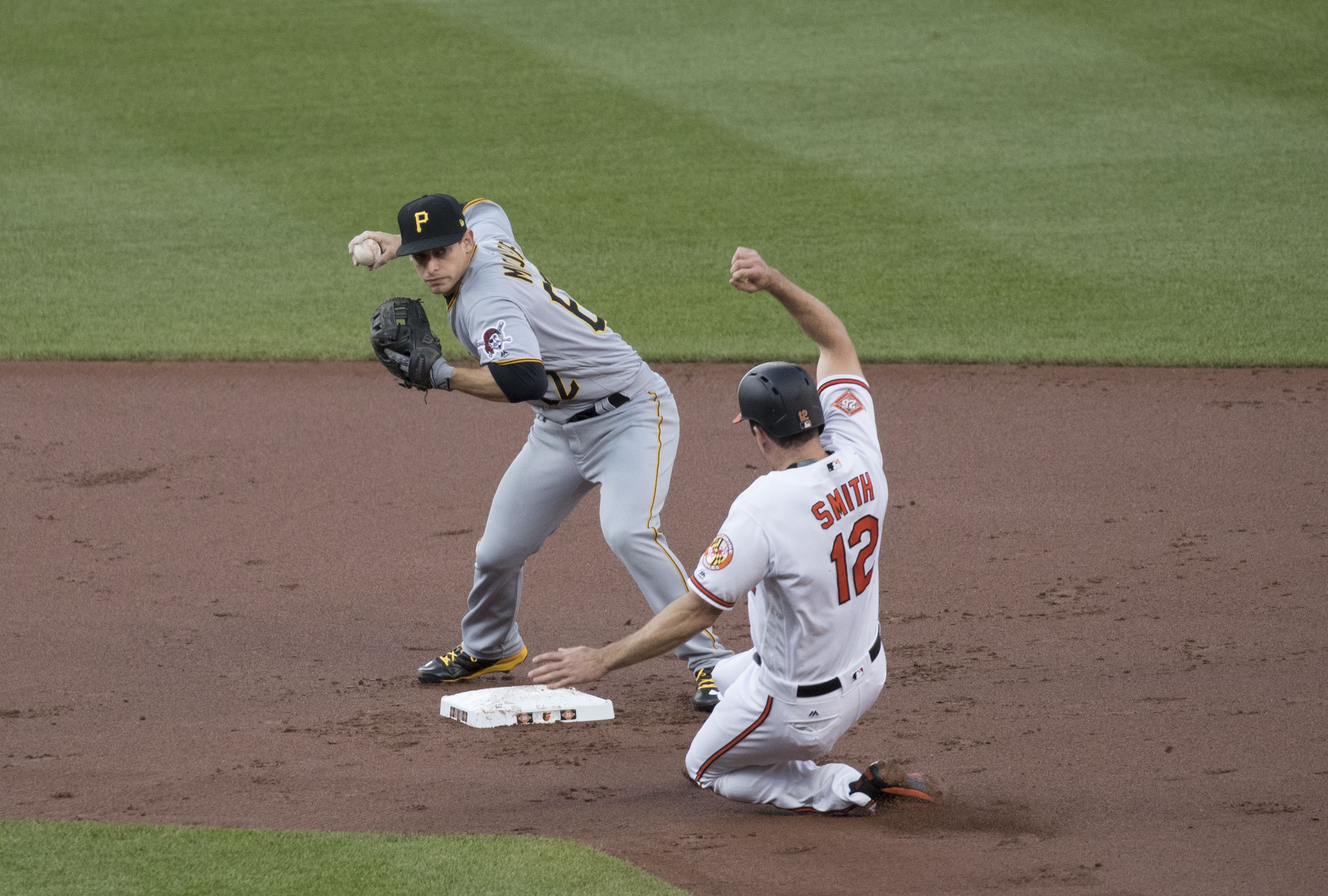
After stepping on second base, Pittsburgh Pirates infielder Max Moroff throws to first base to complete a double play as Baltimore Orioles baserunner Seth Smith slides into the base

In baseball and softball, a double play (denoted as DP in baseball statistics) is the act of making two outs during the same continuous play. Double plays can occur any time there is at least one baserunner and fewer than two outs.

In Major League Baseball (MLB), the double play is defined in the Official Rules in the Definitions of Terms, and for the official scorer in Rule 9.11. During the 2023 Major League Baseball season, teams completed an average 132 double plays per 162 games played during the regular season.

== Examples ==
The simplest scenario for a double play is a runner on first base with less than two outs. In that context, five example double plays are:

- The batter hits a ground ball
  - to an infielder or the pitcher, who throws the ball to one of the middle infielders, who steps on second base to force out the runner coming from first (first out), and then throws the ball to the first baseman in time to force out the batter (second out). As both outs are made by force plays, this is referred to as a "force double play". This is the most common double play. The neighborhood play is a source of controversy, as umpires sometimes call the runner at second base out despite the infielder not clearly touching that base, but merely being "in the neighborhood".
  - to the first baseman, who steps on first base to force out the batter (first out), and with the baserunner trying to advance from first base to second base, throws the ball to the shortstop who puts out the runner (second out). This is referred to as a "reverse force double play", although executing the first out removes the condition that forced the runner to take second base. The second out is not a force play and must be made with a tag.
- The batter hits the ball in the air
  - a line drive to the first baseman, who catches it (first out), and then steps on first base before the baserunner can return to first to tag up (second out). This is also an example of an unassisted double play.
  - a deep fly ball to the right fielder, who catches it (first out), meanwhile the baserunner tags up and attempts to advance, and the outfielder throws the ball to the shortstop who tags the runner before he reaches second base (second out).
- The batter strikes out (first out)
  - Meanwhile, the runner attempts to steal second base, and the catcher throws the ball to a middle infielder, who tags the runner before he reaches the base (second out). This is colloquially known as a "strike 'em out, throw 'em out" double play.

Double plays can occur in many ways in addition to these examples, and can involve many combinations of fielders. A double play can include an out resulting from a rare event, such as interference or an appeal play.

=== Recordkeeping ===
Per standard baseball positions, the examples given above are recorded, respectively, as:

- 4-6-3 (second baseman to shortstop to first baseman) or 6-4-3 (shortstop to second baseman to first baseman). Other combinations start with 1 (pitcher), 3 (first baseman), or (5 third baseman), followed by 6-3 or 4-3 depending on which middle infielder is covering second base on the play.
- 3-6 (first baseman to shortstop)
- 3 (first baseman), unassisted
- 9-6 (right fielder to shortstop)
- K (strike out), 2-6 CS (caught stealing, catcher to shortstop) or 2-4 CS (caught stealing, catcher to second baseman)

Double plays that are initiated by a batter hitting a ground ball are recorded in baseball statistics as GIDP (grounded into double play). This statistic has been tracked since 1933 in the National League and since 1939 in the American League. This statistic does not include line-outs into double plays, for which there is no official statistic for a batter.

== Strategy ==
The double play is a coup for the fielding team and debilitating to the batting team. The fielding team can select pitches to induce a double play — such as a sinker, which is more likely to be hit as a ground ball — and can position fielders to make a ground ball more likely to be turned into a double play. The batting team may take action — such as a hit and run play — to reduce the chance of grounding into a force double play.

== Slang ==
In baseball slang, making a double play is referred to as "turning two" or a "twin killing" (a play on "twin billing", a moviehouse offering two features on the same ticket). Double plays are also known as "the pitcher's best friend" because they disrupt offense more than any other play, except for the rare triple play. A force double play made on a ground ball hit to the third baseman, who throws to the second baseman, who then throws to the first baseman, is referred to as an "around the horn" double play.

The ability to "make the pivot" on a force double play – receiving a throw from the third base side, then quickly turning and throwing to first base – is a key skill for a second baseman.

== Tinker to Evers to Chance ==
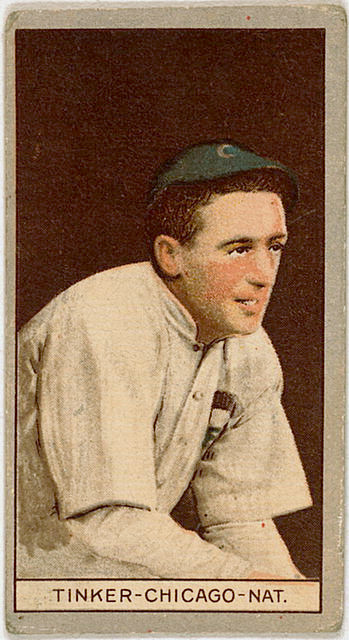
Tinker

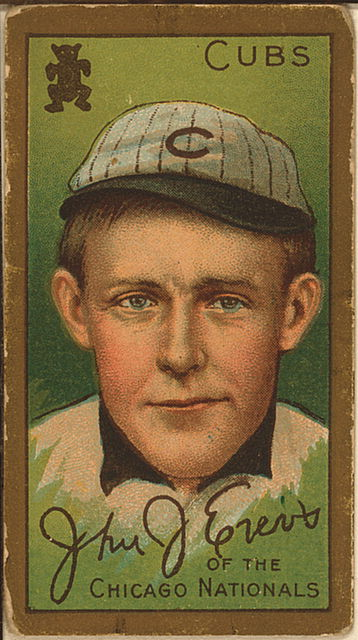
Evers

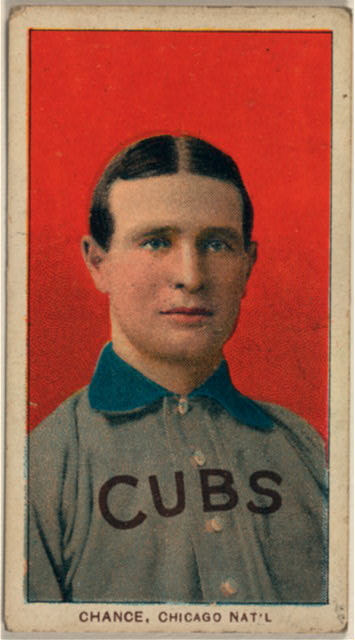
Chance

The most famous double play trio—although they never set any records—were Joe Tinker, Johnny Evers and Frank Chance, who were the shortstop, second baseman and first baseman, respectively, for the Chicago Cubs between 1902 and 1912. Their double play against the New York Giants in a 1910 game inspired Giants fan Franklin Pierce Adams to write the short poem Baseball's Sad Lexicon, otherwise known as Tinker to Evers to Chance, which immortalized the trio. All three players were part of the Cubs team that won the National League pennant in 1906, 1907, 1908, and 1910, and the World Series in 1907 and 1908, turning 491 double plays on the way. They were elected to the National Baseball Hall of Fame in 1946.

== Odd and notable double plays ==
Often, the most common type of double play occurs when a ground ball is hit with a runner on first. In this case, the defense typically throws the ball to second base to get the first out before throwing the ball to first base for the second out. The scenarios below, however, occurred in uncommon plays.

- 2016, New York Yankees vs. San Francisco Giants: In a rare 4-1-5 double play against the San Francisco Giants on July 24, 2016, in the top of the 8th inning, the Giants had Mac Williamson on first base with one out, when Ramiro Peña hit a ground ball that got by Yankees' first baseman Mark Teixeira but was fielded on the edge of the outfield grass by Starlin Castro. Castro threw to pitcher Chad Green at first base to retire Peña. Meanwhile, Williamson had rounded second on his way to third, and a throw from Green to third baseman Chase Headley resulted in Williamson being tagged out, ending the inning.
- 1985, New York Yankees vs. Chicago White Sox: A bizarre 8-6-2 double play occurred in a nationally televised game between the New York Yankees and Chicago White Sox on August 2, 1985, in the bottom of the 7th inning. With Bobby Meacham on second base and Dale Berra on first base, Rickey Henderson hit a single to deep left-center field. Berra ran quickly from first to second, while Meacham stopped his run towards third to return to second base to tag up (expecting the ball would be caught). After the ball was not caught, both runners – now within a few yards of each other – ran to third and then tried to score. A throw from Luis Salazar in centerfield to Ozzie Guillén at shortstop was relayed to catcher Carlton Fisk in time for him to tag out both Meacham and Berra at the plate.
- 2006, Los Angeles Dodgers vs. New York Mets: A very similar 9-4-2 double play occurred on October 4, 2006, in Game 1 of the National League Division Series between the Los Angeles Dodgers and the New York Mets. After Russell Martin hit a single to right field, both Jeff Kent and J.D. Drew were tagged out at the plate by catcher Paul Lo Duca.
- 1985, Toronto Blue Jays vs. Seattle Mariners: 9-2-7-2 double play on July 9, 1985, effectively ended the career of Toronto Blue Jays catcher Buck Martinez. With Phil Bradley – a former University of Missouri football player – on second base, Gorman Thomas hit a single to right field. As Bradley rounded third, Blue Jays' right fielder Jesse Barfield charged and fielded the ball and threw to Martinez, who had just enough time to catch the ball before being struck by a charging Bradley. Despite suffering a broken leg and severely dislocated ankle, Martinez maintained control of the ball and registered the out at home plate. As Thomas rounded second, Martinez attempted to throw to third base from a seated position, but the ball missed the third baseman and went into left field. On the error, Thomas rounded third in an attempt to score. Left fielder George Bell fielded the ball near the left-field foul line and quickly returned the ball with a perfect one-hop throw to the still seated and virtually immobile Martinez, who tagged out Thomas.
- 2014, Pittsburgh Pirates vs. San Francisco Giants: On July 30, 2014, a 1-6-1-5 double play occurred without the ball being put into play in top of the 6th inning a game between the Pittsburgh Pirates and San Francisco Giants. Giants reliever Jean Machi, having inherited Gaby Sanchez (as a pinch-runner for Ike Davis) and Travis Snider as base-runners and having allowed a sacrifice to Jordy Mercer, issued a one-out walk to Chris Stewart with first base open. However, since the ball is still live on a walk, Machi, noticing that Snider was well off second base, threw the ball to shortstop Brandon Crawford, who chased down and tagged out Snider for the second out of the inning. Crawford then saw Sanchez having vacated third base and trying to score, and so Crawford threw the ball to Machi (by now in the third base line) to chase Sanchez back to third. Machi then threw the ball to Pablo Sandoval, who chased down and tagged out Sanchez for the third out.
- 2019, Atlanta Braves vs. Chicago Cubs: Another double play without the ball being put into play happened on June 25, 2019, between the Atlanta Braves and Chicago Cubs at Wrigley Field. In the bottom of the second inning, Braves starter Max Fried walked Javier Báez and Willson Contreras, then after striking out David Bote, walked Addison Russell to load the bases and bring up Cubs pitcher Adbert Alzolay to the plate with one out. Alzolay attempted to bunt on the first pitch he saw from Fried, but missed. Báez, already taking off for home, was then caught in a run-down by Braves catcher Brian McCann between third base and home plate, who then threw to third baseman Josh Donaldson, who then chased down Báez for the second out. Moving over to cover third, Braves shortstop Dansby Swanson then received a throw from Donaldson to tag out Contreras attempting to advance to third, ending the inning. The play was scored 2-5-6.
- 2023, San Francisco Giants vs. Atlanta Braves: On August 27, 2023, the San Francisco Giants recorded a rare 3-1-4-2 double play against the Atlanta Braves. With the Braves batting with one out in the top of the fifth inning, Ronald Acuña Jr. hit a slow roller toward first base that was fielded by first baseman J. D. Davis, who flipped the ball to pitcher Scott Alexander, who in turn underhanded the ball to second baseman Thairo Estrada at first base to force out Acuña. Estrada then threw to catcher Patrick Bailey, whose glove brushed the batting gloves in Orlando Arcia's back pocket for the out at home, ending the inning. It was the first time in the expansion era that a 3-1-4-2 play had been turned.

Shifts away from normal defensive alignment can create scenarios in which unusual double plays can occur.

- 2008, New York Yankees vs. Boston Red Sox: During the April 12, 2008, game between the New York Yankees and the Boston Red Sox, in the top of the 7th inning the Boston infield was shifted right for New York left-handed power hitter Jason Giambi, with a baserunner on first. Giambi grounded to second baseman Dustin Pedroia, who threw to third baseman Kevin Youkilis, covering second due to the shift. Youkilis tagged second, then threw to first baseman Sean Casey to complete the rare 4-5-3 double play.
- 2014, Chicago Cubs vs. Pittsburgh Pirates: The Chicago Cubs turned a 7-2-3 double play against the Pittsburgh Pirates on April 2, 2014. Tied 3–3 in the bottom of the 13th inning, the Pirates loaded the bases with no outs. The Cubs then defensively placed left fielder Junior Lake in the infield, near the third base line. Batter Clint Barmes hit a ground ball to Lake, who threw home for one out, and the catcher then threw to first base for the second out.

In rare cases, a play can also last long enough for an outfielder to reach the infield to record a double play.

- 2019, Arizona Diamondbacks vs. Colorado Rockies: On August 13, 2019, in the top of the 8th inning, with one out and Nick Ahmed on third and Wilmer Flores at first, Diamondbacks outfielder Jarrod Dyson hit a sharp grounder to Rockies' first baseman Daniel Murphy. Ahmed broke on contact for home plate, and with the Rockies already down 9–2, Murphy, playing in to try to prevent another run from scoring, elected to bluff a throw home to keep Ahmed from being able to score. In the process, Murphy was able to run across the baseball diamond with the ball and tag Ahmed out before he could return to third base. Meanwhile, Flores had remained on second, but Dyson was heading toward second. Noticing this, Murphy then threw to second baseman Ryan McMahon, who chased back Dyson toward second, near where Flores remained. McMahon then threw back toward Murphy, causing Dyson to return to first. Murphy then threw over to first base, where Rockies pitcher Chad Bettis, now having reached first base, was positioned, to chase Dyson away from first. By this time, Garrett Hampson, a natural second baseman playing center field as a defensive substitute, had reached the infield, took the throw from Bettis, who then tagged out Dyson between first and second to end the half-inning. The play, lasting more than 20 seconds in total, was scored 3-4-3-1-8.
- 2021, St. Louis Cardinals vs. Chicago Cubs: On September 25, 2021, the Cardinals recorded a 3-2-5-4-2-8-6 double play against the Chicago Cubs. With the Cubs batting in the bottom of the 8th inning, down 5-4, David Bote led off the inning with a triple to left field off pitcher T.J. McFarland. Trayce Thompson walked on a 3-1 count, and Sergio Alcantara struck out swinging for the first out. With one out, on a 1-1 count, runners on first and third base, Rafael Ortega hit a ground ball to first baseman Paul Goldschmidt. Goldschmidt fielded the ball to catcher Yadier Molina, whom he and the third baseman Nolan Arenado forced Bote into a rundown between third and home. Molina fielded the ball to Arenado, who tagged Bote for the second out. Arenado fielded the ball to second baseman Tommy Edman, who threw it back to Molina, who was between second and third base. He fielded the ball to center fielder Harrison Bader, who was at second. Bader threw the ball to shortstop Paul DeJong, who tagged Thompson to complete the 3-2-5-4-2-8-6 double play.
- 2025, Milwaukee Brewers vs. Los Angeles Dodgers: On October 13, 2025, the Milwaukee Brewers recorded an 8-6-2 double play (officially scored a "groundout") against the Los Angeles Dodgers during Game 1 of the National League Championship Series, as centerfielder Sal Frelick parlayed an attempted catch that bounced off the outfield wall into force outs at home plate and third base, with both outs being made by catcher William Contreras. It was the first 8-6-2 double play in post-season history.

And occasionally, the play seems common when looking at the stats, but the eyewitness account tells another story.

- 2024, New York Mets and Philadelphia Phillies: On June 9, 2024, the New York Mets and Philadelphia Phillies contested the second game of the 2024 London Series, with the Phillies playing home. In the bottom of the ninth inning, with the bases loaded and one out, the Phillies were down by a run with Nick Castellanos at bat. Mets catcher Luis Torrens and first baseman Pete Alonso turned a 2-3 double play on a ground ball (Castellanos' bat broke, and the ball stayed near home plate), the first such double play to end a game in major-league history.

== All-time double play leaders by position ==
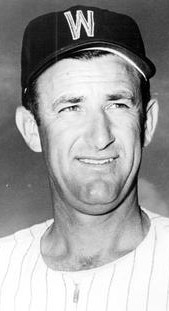
Mickey Vernon was part of 2044 double plays in his 20-year career.

=== Single season ===
1B - Ferris Fain: 194 (Philadelphia Athletics, 1949)
2B - Bill Mazeroski: 161 (Pittsburgh Pirates, 1966)
SS - Rick Burleson: 147 (Boston Red Sox, 1980)
3B - Graig Nettles: 54 (Cleveland Indians 1971)
LF - Bibb Falk: 9 (Chicago White Sox, 1927) and Alfonso Soriano: 9 (Washington Nationals, 2006)
CF - Happy Felsch: 14 (Chicago White Sox, 1919)
RF - Mel Ott: 12 (New York Giants, 1929) and Chief Wilson: 12 (St. Louis Cardinals, 1914)
C - Steve O'Neill: 36 (Cleveland Indians, 1916)

=== Career ===
1B - Mickey Vernon: 2044 (20 seasons)
2B - Bill Mazeroski: 1706 (17 seasons)
SS - Omar Vizquel: 1734 (24 seasons)
3B - Brooks Robinson: 618 (23 seasons)
LF - Bobby Veach: 42 (14 seasons)
CF - Tris Speaker: 107 (22 seasons)
RF - Harry Hooper: 65 (17 seasons)
C - Ray Schalk: 222 (18 seasons)

== All-time GIDP leaders ==
=== Single season ===
Jim Rice: 36 (Boston Red Sox, 1984)

=== Career ===
Albert Pujols: 426

=== Team ===
The team record for a single game is seven GIDPs, set by the San Francisco Giants on May 4, 1969, in a 3–1 loss to the Houston Astros. The Pittsburgh Pirates suffered seven double plays (only six GIDPs) on August 17, 2018, in a 1–0 loss to the Chicago Cubs. The 1990 Boston Red Sox grounded into 174 double plays to set the single season team record.

== See also ==
- Triple play
- Baseball statistics
