= Catch (baseball) =

Action in baseball

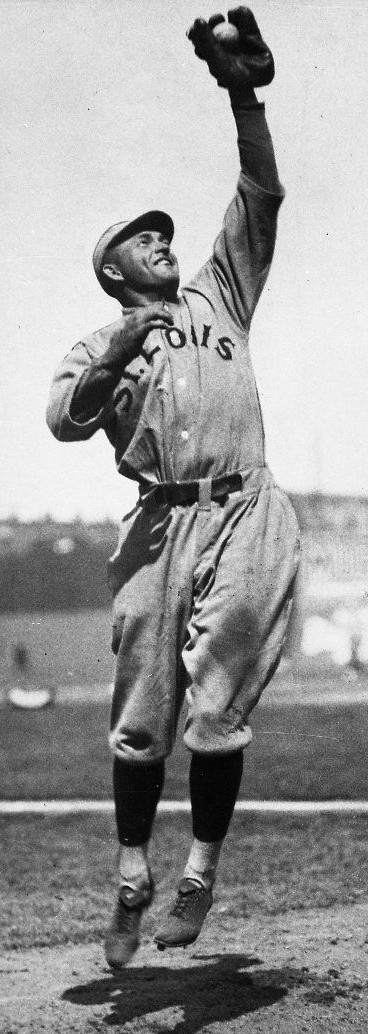
Rogers Hornsby making a catch

In baseball, a catch occurs when a fielder gains secure possession of a batted ball before it bounces, and maintains possession until they voluntarily or intentionally release the ball. When a catch occurs, the batter is out (said to have flied out), and runners are in jeopardy of being put out if any fielder with possession of the ball reaches their starting base before they do.

Unlike in American football and other sports, neither secure possession for a time nor for a number of steps is enough to demonstrate that a catch has occurred. A fielder may, for example, appear to catch and hold a batted ball securely, take a few more steps, collide with a wall or another player, and drop the ball. This is not a catch.

Umpires signal a catch with the out signal: a fist raised into the air, often with a hammering motion; if there is doubt about it, the umpire will likely shout "That's a catch!" On a close no-catch, the umpire will signal with the safe signal, which is both arms swept to the side and extended, accompanied by the call "No catch, no catch!" with an emphasis on the word "no".

To avoid ambiguity with the common term catch meaning any action that gains possession of a ball, some may say that a fielder gloved a thrown or batted, bouncing ball.

== Illegal catches ==
The fielder must catch the ball with their hand or glove. If the fielder uses their cap, protector, pocket or any other part of their uniform in getting possession, it is not a catch. Therefore, a foul ball which directly becomes lodged in the equipment of the catcher (other than their glove) is not considered a catch and hence not a foul tip.

It is not a catch if the batted ball hits a fielder, then hits a member of the offensive team or an umpire, and then is caught by another defensive player.

A catch is legal if the ball is finally held by any fielder before it touches the ground. Runners may leave their bases the instant the first fielder touches the ball. A fielder may reach over a fence, a railing, a rope, or a line of demarcation to make a catch. They may jump on top of a railing or a canvas that may be in foul ground. Interference should not be called in cases where a spectator comes into contact with a fielder and a catch is not made if the fielder reaches over a fence, a railing, a rope. The fielder does so at their own risk.

If a fielder, attempting a catch at the edge of the dugout, is "held up" and kept from an apparent fall by a player or players of either team and the catch is made, it shall be allowed.

== See also ==
Other sports

- Catch (cricket)
