= Slide (baseball) =

Dropping to the ground to try and reach base

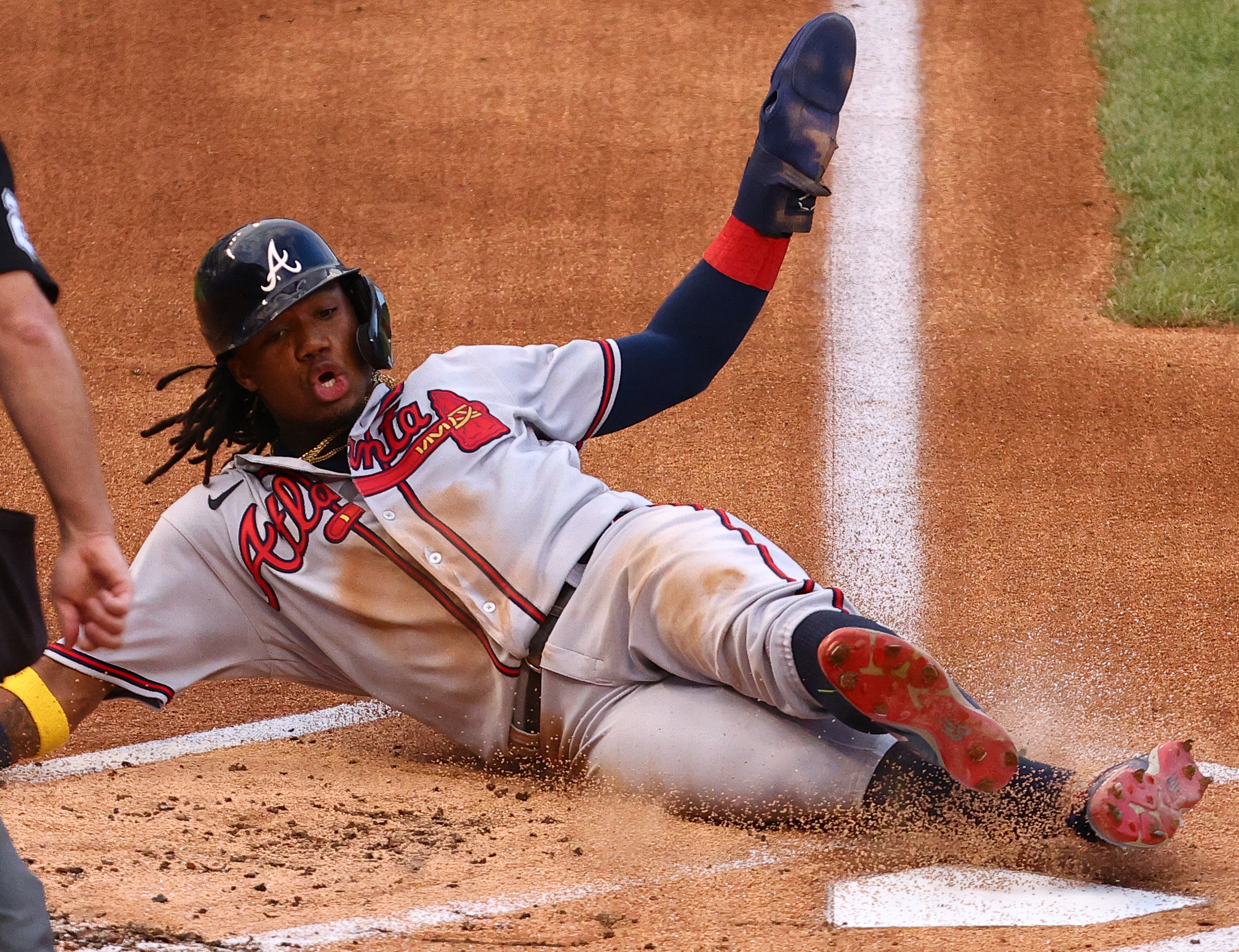
Ronald Acuna Jr. of the Atlanta Braves sliding into home plate

In baseball, a slide is the action of a player, acting as a baserunner, who drops his body to the ground once he is very close to the base he is approaching and slides along the ground to reach the base. Sliding is widely considered to be an essential component of baserunning in both baseball and softball.

A baserunner may slide into a base in a number of different ways and for a number of perceived reasons, including to avoid a tag out, to avoid overrunning the base, and to interfere or avoid contact with the defensive player protecting the base. Players determine whether they will benefit by sliding in a particular game situation. Adult amateur players may also consider the question of whether or not the increased risk of injury will make a slide worthwhile.

Players generally slide feet-first but sometimes also use a head-first technique. Strictly speaking, going headfirst into a base constitutes more of a dive than a slide, but the term "slide" is still commonly used. This alternate method has been used in Major League Baseball at least since the middle-1880s when the innovation was popularized by the St. Louis Browns of the American Association. Yet even in the majors, it remained relatively uncommon until it became popularized by Pete Rose in the 1960s. Headfirst sliding has since become a common practice for various players on all levels of professional baseball, but it is often restricted on the amateur level.

== Reasons for sliding ==
=== Avoiding a tag out ===
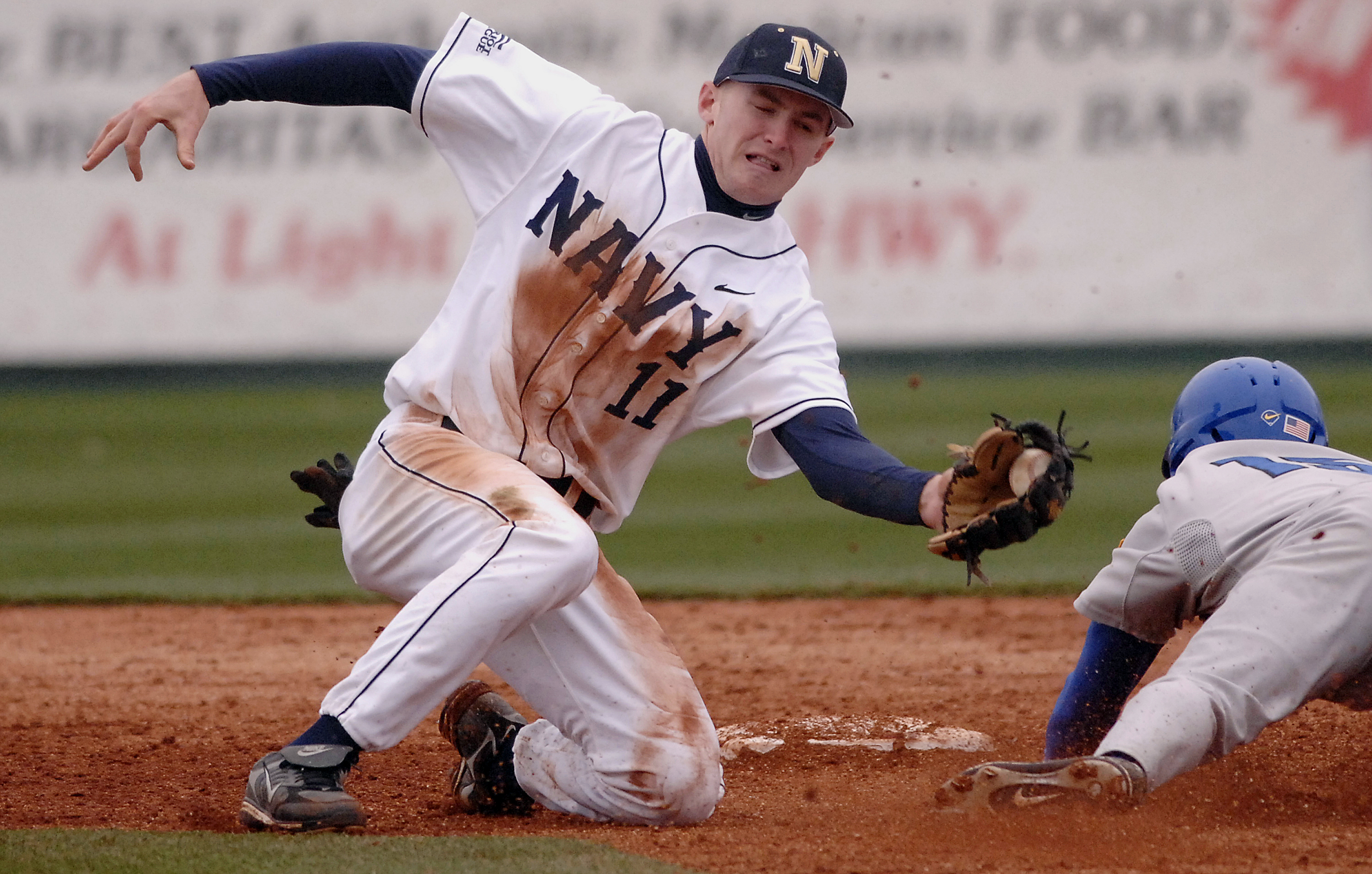
A shortstop attempts to tag out a player sliding head-first into a base

On plays in which the baserunner may be tagged out by the opposing defensive player covering the base, the baserunner's body being down on the ground presents the lowest-profile target for the defensive player to tag. This makes it slightly more difficult for the defensive player to apply the tag in time to put out the baserunner.

=== Avoiding overrunning the base ===
Sliding helps a runner stop his forward momentum through the friction created between the body and the ground, thus reducing the likelihood that he will run past the base after touching it. This is important because in most cases a runner is in jeopardy of being tagged out if he loses contact with the base (the most common exception is that a batter-runner may overrun first base when initially reaching that base as long as he immediately returns to first base without attempting to advance to second base). Because the runner must balance the need to reach a base as quickly as possible with the need to avoid overrunning the base, sliding provides a rapid means for the runner to decelerate, allowing the baserunner to run at top speed as long as possible before needing to slow down.

=== Interfering with the defensive player (take-out slide) ===
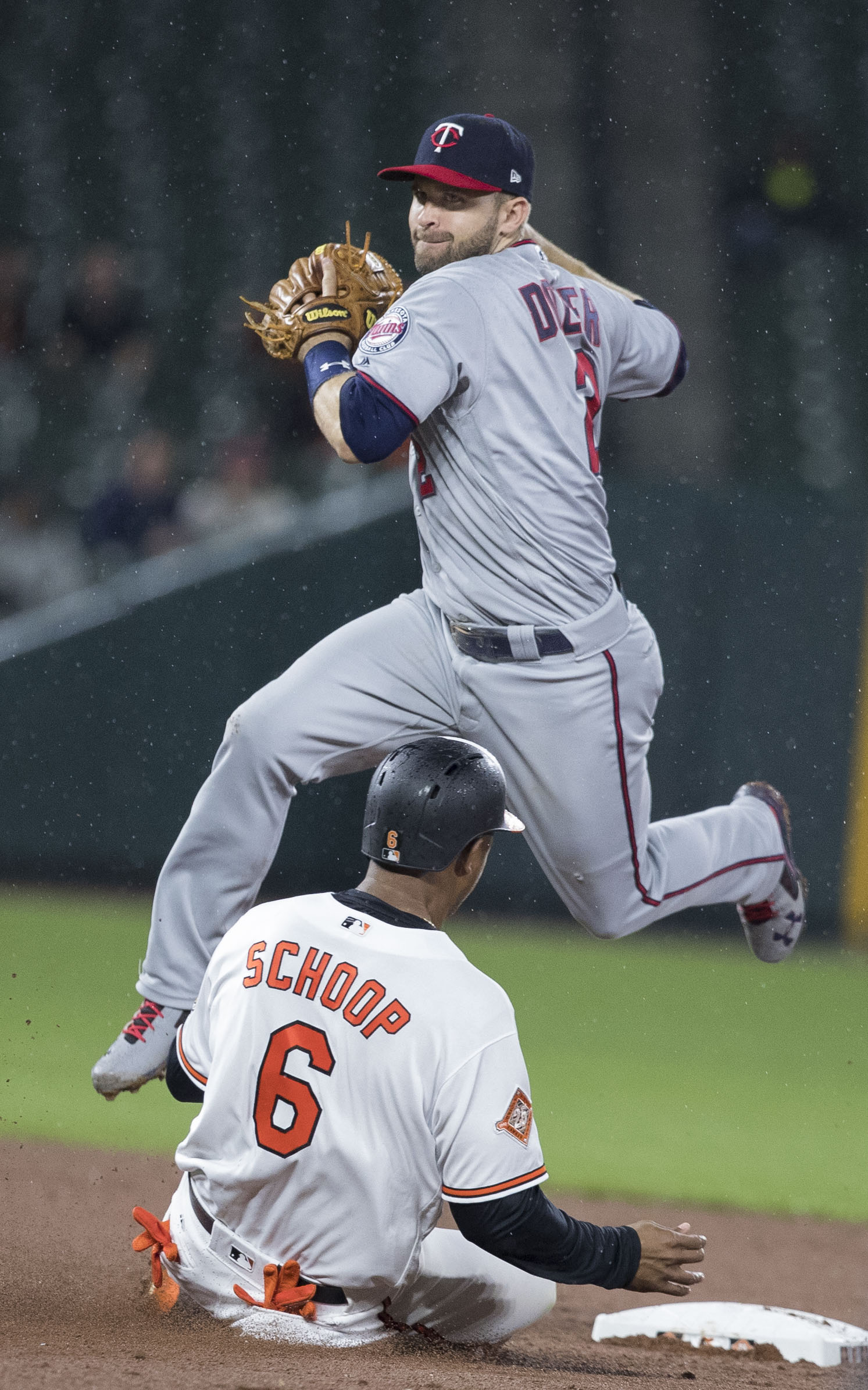
An infielder is forced to jump while throwing to avoid a sliding runner.

Sliding can sometimes be used as a means of interfering with the play of the opposing defensive player who is covering the base being approached. For example, when it is possible that a double play might occur, and the baserunner approaching second base has already been put out, he might still try to slide toward the defensive player who intends to throw the ball to first base. If the defensive player moves away from second base as he prepares to throw the ball toward first, the baserunner may still slide directly toward the defensive player, even though that means sliding away from second base itself. This has the effect of hampering that defensive player's ability to complete the play, either directly by making physical contact with him, or indirectly by distracting him by making him fearful of such contact. A slide performed exclusively for the purpose of hampering the play of the defense is called a "take-out slide".

Whether a particular instance of a take-out slide is legal within the rules of baseball is a judgement call made by the umpire, usually based upon how close the baserunner comes to the base they are approaching during the slide. If a baserunner strays too far from the base when attempting a take-out slide, the umpire may declare the slide to be an example of illegal interference and call an extra out. As a general (but not absolute) guideline, even if the baserunner clearly slides toward the defensive player and away from the base, so long as the baserunner comes close enough to the base that he is able to touch it with some part of his body during the slide, the slide will be ruled to be legal. On the flip side, the fielder will often be granted the "neighborhood play" under such circumstances.

In Major League Baseball, rules have been implemented and re-interpreted to reduce injury risk from potential take-out slides. A notable take-out slide incident occurred in the Game 2 of the 2015 National League Division Series: with the Los Angeles Dodgers trailing the New York Mets by a run with one out in the seventh inning, Dodgers' baserunner Chase Utley broke up a potential inning-ending double play by sliding well past second base and ultimately breaking the fibula of Mets' shortstop Rubén Tejada as Tejada attempted to make the turn. Upon replay review, Tejada did not have possession of the ball on the base, and was not granted the neighborhood play; Utley was ruled safe at second base, the inning continued with just one out and the Dodgers scored four runs in the frame to eventually win the game. Major League Baseball initially suspended Utley for two games for his conduct "in violation of Official Baseball Rule 5.09 (a) (13), which is designed to protect fielders from precisely this type of rolling block that occurs away from the base." Utley appealed the suspension and remained active for the rest of the Dodgers' post-season games; before the next season, MLB dropped Utley's suspension on March 6, 2016, with Chief Baseball Officer Joe Torre stating "There wasn't anything clear-cut to say that play violated a rule." Tejada, meanwhile, appeared in only 83 major league games over parts of three seasons after the injury, compared to 582 games in six seasons before it, and never appeared in another postseason game. In response to the slide itself, MLB and the MLB Players Association agreed that offseason on a clarification of rule rule 6.01 (j) (dubbed the "Chase Utley slide rule"), that "slides on potential double plays will require runners to make a bona fide attempt to reach and remain on the base. Runners may still initiate contact with the fielder as a consequence of an otherwise permissible slide. A runner will be specifically prohibited from changing his pathway to the base or utilizing a 'roll block' for the purpose of initiating contact with the fielder."

=== Avoiding collision or injury from errant throw ===
Particularly for younger players, proper sliding technique has been shown to protect the runner and fielder from colliding and can prevent the runner from being hit by an errant throw. For this reason, most youth baseball leagues now advise teaching proper sliding technique at a young age and urge kids to slide feet-first into any base (except first base) whenever there is a potentially close play. This concept is somewhat more controversial in adult amateur baseball/softball leagues since the risk of injury from sliding increases with age.

== Speed impact of sliding ==
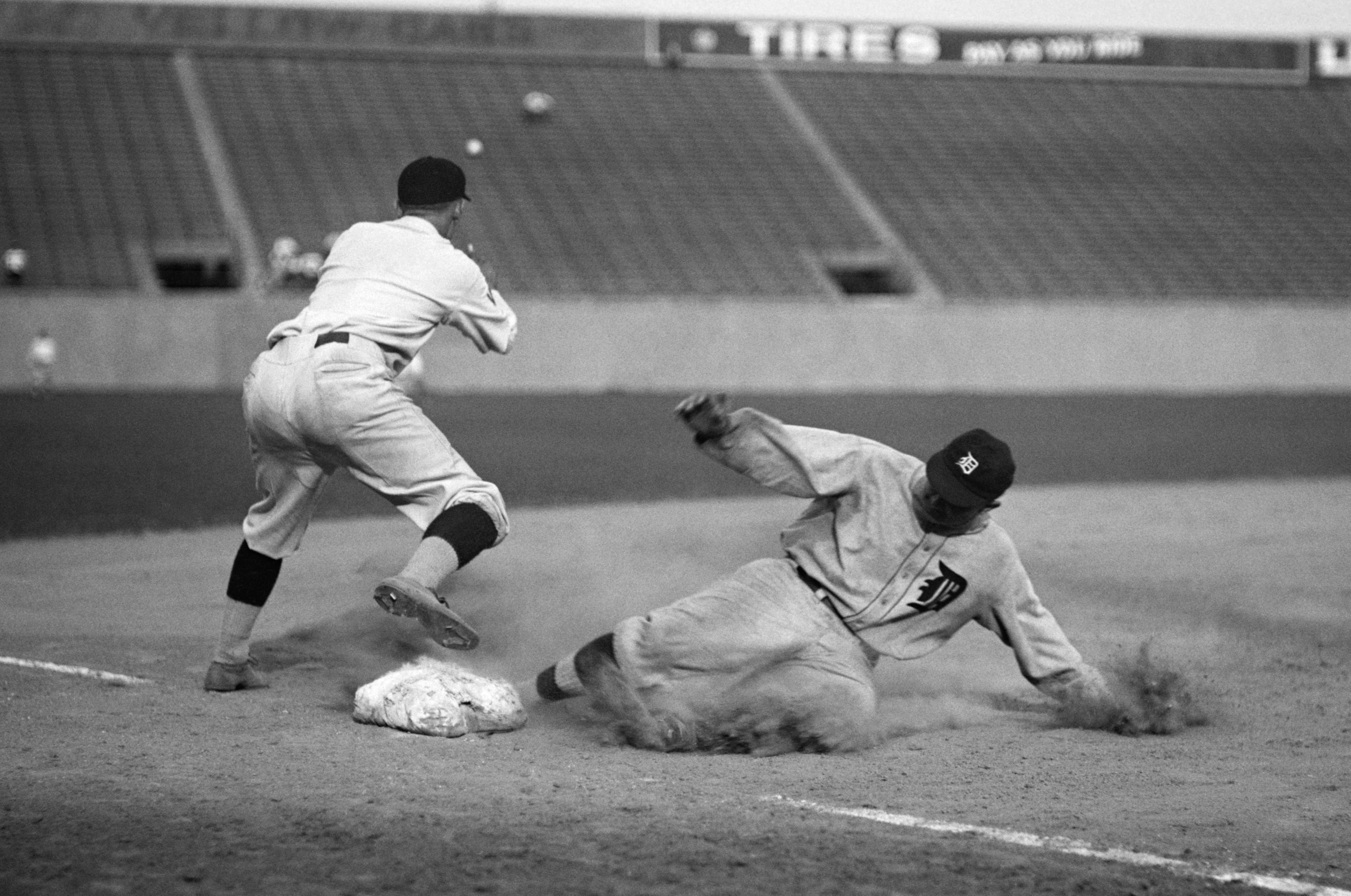
Legendary early 20th century American player Ty Cobb sliding safely into third base.

The television series MythBusters tested participants' baserunning speed with and without sliding, and found that in cases where the runner needs to stop on the base, sliding into that base instead of staying upright provided a split second of advantage, suggesting the more rapid deceleration as the key. However, when removing the need to stop, the general belief within baseball circles is that remaining upright and running all the way to the base at top speed allows a baserunner to reach the base faster than sliding. Consequently, on plays during which neither being tagged out nor being put in jeopardy by overrunning the base is at issue (e.g., when approaching first base after having batted the ball and nobody is trying to make a tag play), players are usually advised not to slide. Nonetheless, this conventional wisdom is not universally accepted, and as such, some players may feel that sliding will get them to the base more quickly and will thus choose to do so despite advice to the contrary.

== Risks associated with sliding ==
One study in The American Journal of Sports Medicine followed seven softball and three baseball teams in Division I of the NCAA, and found the overall incidence of injuries sustained while sliding was 9.51 per 1000 slides. Softball players had about twice the incidence of sliding injuries as baseball players in the study. 11% (four out of 37) of the injuries caused the player to miss more than 7 days of participation.

Because baseball shoes are spiked on the bottom, sliding with the spikes up increases the probability of injury to the defensive player covering the base. Knowledge of this fact can often increase the defensive player's fear of the possible contact from an impending slide and thus increase his distraction while attempting to make a play.
