= Fourth out =

Out in baseball, possible only in the same play as a third out

In baseball, a fourth out is a legal out made by the defense after three outs in a half-inning have already been made. According to the rules, the third out does not cause the ball to become dead; if the fielders make a subsequent out that prevents a run from scoring, this out will supersede the apparent third out, thus becoming the recorded third out. The defense successfully makes an appeal while the ball is still live, and the umpire calls a temporary fourth out that (usually) replaces the existing third out. For statistical purposes, the apparent third out is "undone" and the fourth out's result is recorded instead. With the advent of video replay appeals, a new rationale for making extra out(s) has emerged: insurance against a prior out being undone on appeal. These fourth-out situations are not the same as four strikeouts in an inning.

== When runs score ==
The motivation for making a fourth out is to nullify a scored run, either by putting out the runner who had scored (on appeal, if the player failed to tag up after a catch) or putting out an additional runner who is forced to advance.

No run may score on an inning-ending play in which the third out is a force out or one that occurs before the batter reaches first base. In other words, if a run scores, but there is a force out, that run is nullified. It is not uncommon for a runner to reach home plate before the third out is made by force out. The runner does not score but is counted as left on base.

It is also common that the third out might come on a non-force tag out after another runner reaches home plate. By extension of these two rules, the "fourth out" covers the case where the third out is not a force out, but a subsequent out is. Since the force out counts before the run scores, it must also count before the third out.

== Examples ==
There are no known MLB examples of a fourth out changing places with a prior out, cancelling a run. The situations where a fourth out may be recognized are exceedingly rare, but some hypothetical examples and seven real examples where the fourth out rule did come into play are noted below:

=== Hypothetical examples ===
==== An appeal force out ====
Three runners are on base with two outs, and the batter hits the ball within the field of play for an apparent hit. Two important facts are required:

1. The ball has not become dead (i.e., a home run, ground-rule double, umpire interference, or fan interference).
2. The ball is not caught before hitting the ground.

All three runners cross home plate safely, but the runner who was at first misses second base while rounding the bases. After the runner from first has come around to score, the batter is thrown out trying to stretch a bases-clearing double into a triple. The apparent play is that three runners have scored on an apparent double, with the batter out advancing.

RULING: The fielders have a viable appeal play at second base. If the defensive team is alert enough and understands the rules regarding fourth outs, the defensive team may make a live ball appeal that the runner who was initially at first base missed second base. If such an appeal is made, the runner from first base is out on a force out, because he failed to touch his force base (second base). As a result:

- according to baseball rules, the force out means that the batter is credited with a fielder's choice and not a base hit.
- Since no run may score on a play on which the final out of a half-inning is a force out, the inning is over and no run counts. All three apparent runs come off the board.
- The scoring is as follows: Batter grounds into fielder's choice, runner at first out at second (for failing to touch second), and three runners left on base.

This rule merely places the occurrence of the force out before any tag play when it ends the inning.

=== Examples ===
==== A missed fourth out allows a run to be scored ====
On July 1, 1989, in the bottom of the eighth inning in a game between the New York Yankees and the Milwaukee Brewers at old Yankee Stadium, the Yankees scored a run as the Brewers failed to record a fourth out.

With one out and the Yankees up 4–1, Mike Pagliarulo on third base, and Bob Geren on first base, Yankees shortstop Wayne Tolleson attempted a suicide squeeze that became a pop-up caught by Brewers pitcher Jay Aldrich. Both Pagliarulo and Geren broke on contact without tagging up from their respective bases, and Aldrich, noticing this, threw to first baseman Greg Brock to double off Geren from first base, but not until after Pagliarulo crossed home plate. Upon doubling off Geren, the Brewers left the field, thinking the inning was over and the run did not count.

Had Aldrich thrown more quickly to first base to double off Geren—prior to Pagliarulo crossing the plate—no run would have scored. The catching of the pop-up before it had touched the ground eliminated the force play, turning the play into a "time play", requiring the home plate umpire (for this game, Larry Barnett) to judge the position of Pagliarulo at the time Aldrich had doubled off Geren. Alternatively, had Aldrich let the ball drop (without catching the ball and letting it fall out of his glove to the ground) and then thrown to second baseman Jim Gantner or shortstop Gary Sheffield to begin a 1–4–3 or 1–6–3 double play (Aldrich–Gantner or Sheffield–Brock), the run would not have counted since a run cannot score when the final out of a half-inning is a force out or a ground out (presuming Geren was forced at second and Tolleson was out at first). After all of the Brewers players had left fair territory (and therefore losing the chance to launch an appeal play to appeal Pagliarulo's failure to tag from third base), Barnett awarded the run scored by Pagliarulo to the Yankees as per Rule 7.10(a) (now Rule 5.09(c)), giving the Yankees a 5–1 lead, which would be the final score.

If, before leaving the field, the Brewers had launched an appeal play at third base to garner a fourth out, Pagliarulo's failure to tag from third base would have become the actual third out of the inning, and the run would not have scored, and this out would have taken precedence because it would have erased the run. Barnett explained after the game: It's a 'fourth-out' situation. Milwaukee had to throw the ball to third base for the fourth out. Then they can make that the final out and prevent the run from scoring. But Milwaukee didn’t do that." In the aftermath of a July 2018 fourth-out incident, this game would be referenced again.

==== A missed fourth out allows a run to be scored (again) ====
On April 12, 2009, in the top of the second inning in a game between the Los Angeles Dodgers and the Arizona Diamondbacks at Chase Field, the Dodgers scored a run because the Diamondbacks failed to record a fourth out in a play similar to the Yankees–Brewers game in 1989.

With one out and Arizona up 1–0, right fielder Juan Pierre on second base, and left fielder Andre Ethier on third base, Dodgers pitcher Randy Wolf hit a line drive that was caught by Diamondbacks pitcher Dan Haren. Both Pierre and Ethier broke on contact without tagging up from their respective bases, and Haren, noticing this, threw the ball to Diamondbacks second baseman Felipe Lopez, who tagged out Pierre, but not until after Ethier crossed home plate. Upon tagging out Pierre, the Diamondbacks left the field, thinking that the inning was over and the run did not count.

Had Lopez simply stepped on second base before Ethier crossed the plate, no run would have been scored. Because first base was open, instead of a force play, the play became a "time play", requiring the home plate umpire (for this game, Larry Vanover) to judge the position of Ethier at the time that Pierre was put out. After all of the Diamondbacks players had left fair territory (thus losing the chance to launch an appeal play for Ethier's failure to tag from third base), Dodgers bench coach Bob Schaefer informed manager Joe Torre of what was then Rule 7.10 (now Rule 5.09(c)) regarding fourth outs, and Torre went to Vanover to alert him of the rule and situation. Vanover then discussed the situation with crew chief Charlie Reliford, and the Dodgers were awarded the run before the bottom of the second inning began, tying the game 1–1. (The Dodgers would win the game 3–1.)

If the Diamondbacks had launched an appeal play at third base before leaving the field to garner a fourth out, Ethier's failure to tag from third base would have become the actual third out of the inning, and this out would have taken precedence because it would have erased the run.

==== A successful fourth out squelches a scoring threat ====
On April 18, 2014, in the bottom of the second inning of a then-scoreless game between the New York Mets and the Atlanta Braves at Citi Field, the Braves squelched an incipient Mets offensive threat by recording an "insurance" fourth out that anticipated a potential video replay appeal (there was a major expansion of reviewable plays in MLB starting with the 2014 season) by Mets manager Terry Collins, in a game that the Braves would win in a 6–0 shutout of the Mets.

With two out and Lucas Duda as the runner at first, Mets catcher Travis d'Arnaud, trying to check his swing, grounded softly to the right side and, attempting to beat the throw by Braves second baseman Dan Uggla to first baseman Freddie Freeman, was ruled out at first on an extremely close play. Yet with three outs now recorded, Freeman spotted Duda (who was put in motion by d'Arnaud's grounder and, having slowed down, was heading toward third base) and threw the ball across the diamond to third baseman Chris Johnson, who successfully tagged Duda out before he could reach the third-base bag.

Moments later, Collins, who had emerged from the dugout to challenge the out at first (replays shown to the television audience revealed that d'Arnaud was actually safe at first and that Collins would probably have won his appeal) was forced to retreat to the dugout without using his challenge after being informed by the umpiring crew that Freeman and Johnson's successfully recorded fourth out would have rendered his challenge meaningless, as no run would have scored in any event.

==== A fourth out ends an inning after the third out is reversed ====
On July 24, 2018, in the top of the third inning of a game between the Mets and San Diego Padres at Citi Field, with San Diego trailing 3–0, the Padres had loaded the bases with two out, with catcher Austin Hedges on third, center fielder Manuel Margot at second, second baseman Carlos Asuaje at first, and left fielder Wil Myers batting against Mets pitcher Zack Wheeler.

Myers singled off Wheeler into left field. While Hedges scored easily, Margot was ruled to have been tagged out on an extremely close play on a throw by Mets left fielder Michael Conforto to catcher Devin Mesoraco at home plate. Seeing this, Asuaje, who was running to third, broke into a slow jog, thinking the inning was over. Mesoraco, however, threw down the third base line anyway to third baseman Phillip Evans, and Evans tagged Asuaje well before Asuaje reached third base, whereupon third-base umpire Laz Diaz called him out, even though there had already been three apparent outs. The Padres challenged the play at the plate, which was overturned on replay to make the score 3–2 (meaning San Diego kept its challenge), but the half-inning ended because Evans’ tag of Asuaje was now the third out.

Had Asuaje not slowed down and reached third base before being tagged out by Evans, the inning would have continued in a game the Padres would eventually lose to the Mets, 6–3. As the MLB office explained after the game: "The runner attempting to advance to third base was unaffected by the incorrect call and was tagged by the fielder", which follows from Section IV of MLB's replay regulations.

Subsequent Calls and Outs: If the Replay Official determines that an incorrect call on the field had no effect on the subsequent behavior or conduct of the offensive or defensive players, the Replay Official shall change the incorrect call but let stand any on-field calls or plays unaffected by the incorrect call. The Replay Official may not declare a runner out based on a play the umpire believes would have occurred after the play subject to Replay Review.

— Major League Baseball

==== A missed fourth out allows a run to score (2022) ====
On June 29, 2022, in the fifth inning, the Pittsburgh Pirates had runners on second and third when Ke'Bryan Hayes' soft line drive was caught by Washington Nationals first baseman Josh Bell. The runners had tried to advance on contact, so Bell threw to third baseman Ehire Adrianza. Adrianza tagged the Pirates' Hoy Park (R2), who had left second base and then touched third base. The runner on third, Jack Suwinski (R3), scored on the play before Park was tagged. Since the act of the defensive team stepping on the base was not an unmistakable appeal play, this potential fourth out was not recognized by the umpiring crew. The Nationals proceeded to leave the field, which by rule 5.09(c)(4) meant that the Nationals lost their right to appeal the play. After a lengthy delay, the umpiring crew correctly ruled that the run would count. To prevent the run from scoring, the Nationals should have either (a) touched third base before tagging runner R2 or (b) made an unmistakable appeal on runner R3 prior to leaving the field. The Pirates went on to defeat the Nationals 8–7.

==== A successful fourth out squelches a scoring threat (2025) ====
On May 9, 2025, in the top of the sixth inning in a game between the Detroit Tigers and the Texas Rangers at Comerica Park, the Rangers had two runners on base trailing 2-1, with Ezequiel Duran on second and Sam Haggerty on first.

With two outs and Jonah Heim at bat against Tarik Skubal, Heim grounded the ball to Tigers shortstop Trey Sweeney, who threw the ball to second baseman Gleyber Torres in an attempt to force out Haggerty. Second base umpire Jansen Visconti ruled this as the third out. Torres then threw the ball to third baseman Andy Ibáñez, who forced Duran into a rundown and eventually resulted in Sweeney tagging him out going towards home plate.

Replays suggest the call on the field by Visconti of Haggerty being forced out would have been overturned, and had the fourth out not occurred, the Rangers would have the bases loaded with 2 outs down by 1 run. However, with Duran being tagged out, the challenge would have been moot and the inning ruled over. This fourth out may have won the game for the Tigers, as they went on to win 2-1.

==== A missed fourth out allows a run to score (2026) ====
On August 10, 2026, in the top of the seventh inning of a game between the Boston Red Sox and the Toronto Blue Jays at the Rogers Centre, the Red Sox had two runners on base trailing 2-0, with Anthony Seigler on third base and Nick Sogard on first. Ceddanne Rafaela batted with one out, though the scoreboard at the Rogers Centre incorrectly read that there were two outs.

Rafaela hit a fly ball to center field which was caught by center fielder Brett Bateman, and with both runners mistakenly believing there were already two outs, neither Seigler nor Sogard tagged up before advancing. The Blue Jays also initially failed to realize that Bateman's catch was only the second out, but eventually appealed to first to double up Sogard. They then left the field without appealing to third, allowing Seigler's run to count following the umpires calling to New York for a rules confirmation and cutting the Jays' lead to 2-1; however, this would not cost the Blue Jays as this proved to be the final run of the game for either team.

== Sources ==
- Retrosheet regular-season games
