= Neighborhood play =

Baseball play

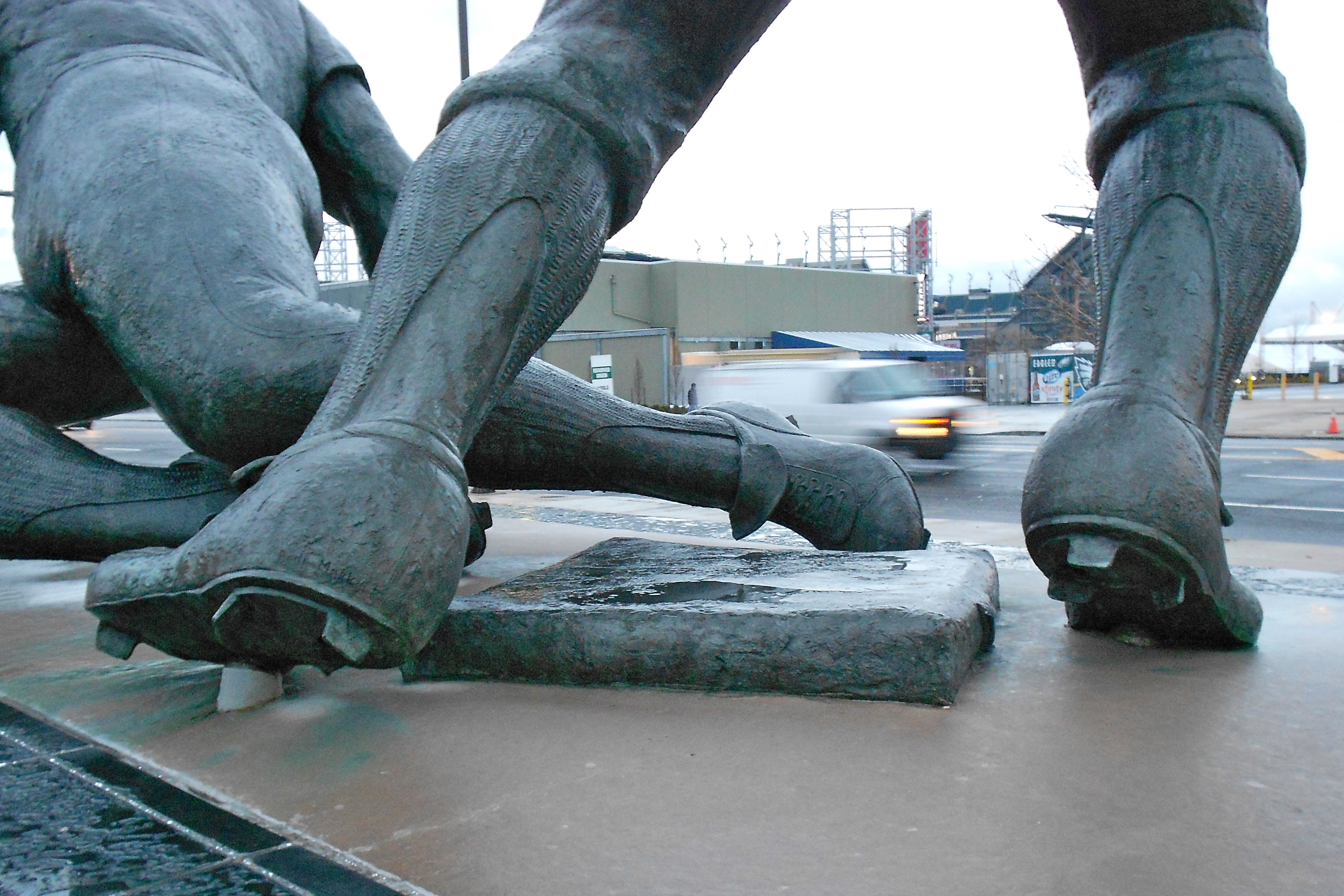
Play at Second Base by sculptor Joe Brown. Both the defensive player and the runner are within a few inches of touching the base.

In baseball, a neighborhood play is a force play in which a fielder receiving the ball in attempting to force out a runner at second base, catches and quickly throws the ball to first base in a double play attempt without actually touching second base, or by touching second base well before catching the ball. By every rules code, such a play is not an out, because to record a force out, the fielder with the ball must actually touch a force base (or tag the forced runner) before the forced runner arrives.

The neighborhood play is called differently at various levels and in various leagues in amateur baseball (such as men's amateur, college, high school, or youth leagues). Its appropriateness and necessity in amateur and even professional baseball is debated. The safety necessity of the rule is lessened by most amateur leagues' use of the force play slide rule, which requires forced-out runners to either slide directly to the base or completely avoid the fielder, but some amateur umpires still treat the neighborhood play as an out.

The traditional application of the neighborhood play for an out developed because it is common for a sliding runner to collide with the fielder at second base, sometimes causing injury. On a double play attempt, the fielder must throw the ball to first base, which would generally require a step directly into the path of the incoming runner. On a close force out at second, a fielder often cannot avoid a collision while completing a throw to first base unless he stays some distance away from second base. For the sake of safety, umpires allowed fielders to score the first out of an attempted double play without actually touching second base as long as it "looked like" an out, i.e. the fielder made a clean catch, turn, and threw near second base before the runner arrived. This allowed the tradition of the take-out slide to continue while still providing a means of safety for middle infielders.

== Instant replay review ==
In 2014, instant replay was added to Major League Baseball, but, along with balls and strikes, the neighborhood play was exempt. However, during the April 2 game between the Chicago Cubs and Pittsburgh Pirates the Cubs challenged a play initially ruled a successful 4-6-3 double play. Crew chief John Hirschbeck allowed the review and it was determined that the force was missed due to a poor throw from the second baseman rather than safety concerns (and therefore not a neighborhood play) and the runner was ruled safe, allowing a run to score from third. The neighborhood play became reviewable in 2016.

== See also ==
- Letter and spirit of the law
