= Caught =

Cricket dismissal method; the ball does not hit the ground after it is batted

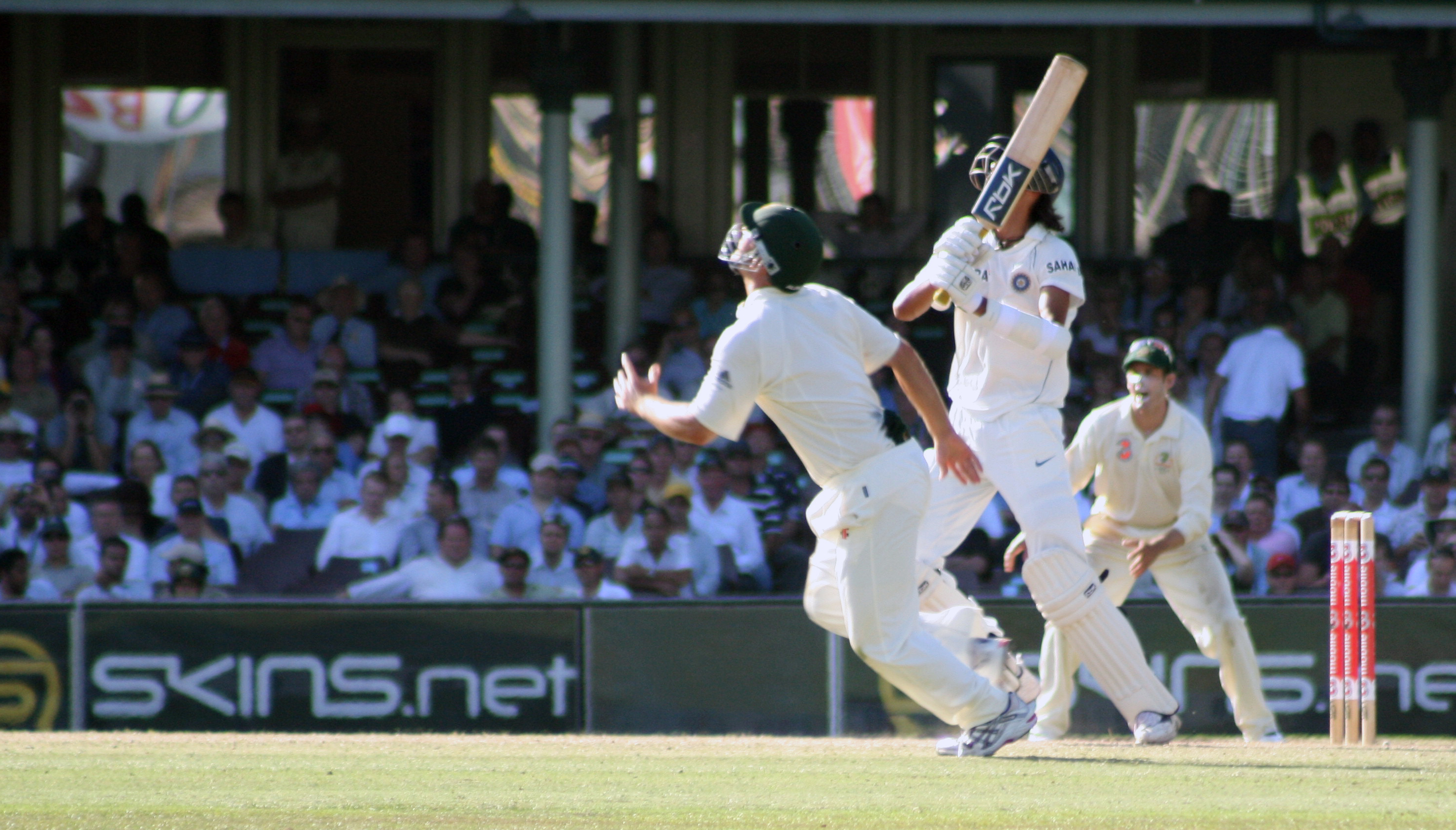
An Australian fielder runs to take a catch

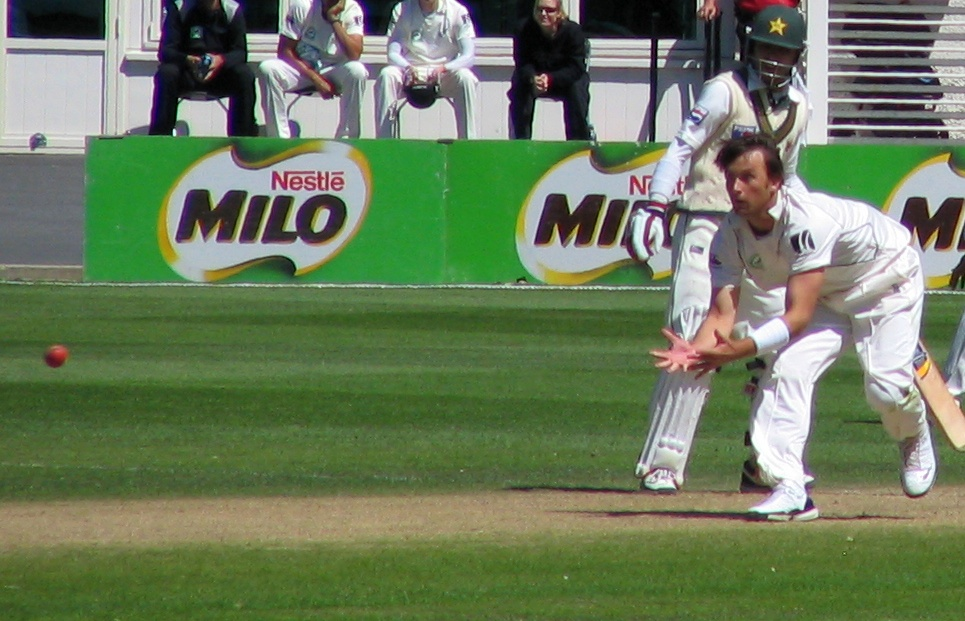
New Zealand fast bowler Shane Bond about to dismiss Mohammad Yousuf caught and bowled

Caught is a method of dismissing a batsman in cricket. A batsman is out caught if the batsman hits the ball, from a legitimate delivery, with the bat, and the ball is caught by the bowler or a fielder before it hits the ground.

If the catch is taken by the wicket-keeper, then informally it is known as caught behind or caught at the wicket. A catch by the bowler is known as caught and bowled. This has nothing to do with the dismissal bowled but is rather a shorthand for saying the catcher and bowler are the same player. (The scorecard annotation is usually c. and b. or c&b followed by the bowler's name.)

Caught is the most common method of dismissal at higher levels of competition, accounting for 36,190 Test match dismissals between 1877 and 2012, which is 56.9% of all Test match dismissals in this period.

South African wicket-keeper Mark Boucher holds the record for the most Test match catches, with 532, while Steve Smith holds the record for the most Test match catches by non-wicket-keepers, with 224 as of October 2026.

== Laws ==
This method of dismissal is covered by Law 33 of the Laws of Cricket, which reads:

The striker is out Caught if a ball delivered by the bowler, not being a No ball, touches his/her bat without having previously been in contact with any fielder, and is subsequently held by a fielder as a fair catch,..., before it touches the ground.

This means that the batsman cannot be out caught if:

- The ball is called a no-ball or dead ball.
- The batsman does not hit the ball with his bat or a gloved hand holding the bat.
- The ball, having been hit, makes contact with the field before a fielder catches the ball.
- The ball does not remain under the control of the fielder.
- The ball is hit and lands beyond or on the boundary; (six runs).
- A fielder taking the catch makes contact with the boundary rope or the area outside the boundary, with any part of his body, equipment, when touching the ball.
- An airborne fielder taking the catch, having not previously legally touched the ball, had his last contact with the ground not entirely within the boundary.

A catch is not completed until the fielder catching the ball obtains complete control over both the ball and his/her own movement (Law 33.3).

Note that if a batsman could be given out both caught and by another method, 'caught' takes precedence, unless the other method is bowled.

If a batsman is out caught, any runs scored off that delivery are voided.

If a batsman is caught, the bowler is credited with the batsman's wicket and the catching fielder is credited for the dismissal; there are no catch assists for saving boundaries before a catch, or deflecting the ball to a different fielder in the slips cordon. If the two batsmen cross each other, in attempting to take a run, before the catch was taken, the non-striking batsman at the time remains at the opposite end of the pitch as the new incoming batsman comes to the crease at his former end. This means, unless it is now a new over, he is now on strike and the incoming batsman is not.

== Adjudication ==
If the catch taken is pronounced or obvious, the players need not appeal to the umpire; the batsman normally chooses to acknowledge the dismissal himself. However, if the ball brushes the edge of the bat, or the catch is taken very close to the ground, or the ball appears to have bounced off the batsman's foot (so it has not touched the ground), or the ball appearing to come off the bat very close to the pitch surface (bump ball), or if the batsman is reluctant to accept that he has been dismissed, then the fielding team has to appeal to the umpire for this decision. In international competition, if neither field umpire can clearly decide if a catch has been made or not, they may refer to the third (television) umpire for a review. The third umpire may also be used if the Umpire Decision Review System is available and a team wishes to dispute a call concerning a possible catch.

== Celebration ==
Before 2000, the Laws of Cricket defined a catch as being completed when the player had "complete control over the further disposal of the ball". In the very strictest sense, this meant that the player did not finish catching the ball until he threw it away, though the player doesn't have to throw the ball to anyone in particular in so doing.

For this reason, even today many cricketers celebrate a catch by lobbing the ball into the air. In a Super Sixes match in the 1999 Cricket World Cup, South African Herschelle Gibbs caught Australian captain Steve Waugh on 56, but Waugh was given not out when Gibbs was ruled to not have control of the ball when attempting to throw the ball in celebration. Waugh went on to score a match-winning 120 not out to qualify his team for the semi-finals; Australia went on to win the tournament.

== Records ==
=== Test matches ===
The wicket-keepers with the highest number of catches taken in Test matches are as follows. Note: this list excludes catches made while not fielding as a wicket-keeper.

Rank	Wicket-keeper	Catches	Test Career dates
1	(South Africa) Mark Boucher	532	1997–2012
2	(Australia) Adam Gilchrist	379	1999–2008
3	(Australia) Ian Healy	366	1988–99
4	(Australia) Rod Marsh	343	1970–84
5	(Cricket West Indies) Jeff Dujon	265	1981–91
6	(Australia) Brad Haddin	262	2008–15
7	(New Zealand) BJ Watling	257	2009–21
8	(India) MS Dhoni	256	2005–14
9	(England) Alan Knott	250	1967–81
10	(England) Matt Prior	243	2007–14

Source: Cricinfo Statsguru. Last updated: 20 June 2024.

The non-wicket-keepers with the highest number of catches taken in Test matches are as follows. Note: this excludes any catches made while fielding as a wicket-keeper.

Rank	Fielder	Catches	Test Career dates
1	(Australia) Steve Smith	224	2010-
2	(England) Joe Root	220	2012-
3	(India) Rahul Dravid	210	1996–2012
4	(Sri Lanka) Mahela Jayawardene	205	1997–2014
5	(South Africa) Jacques Kallis	200	1995–2013
6	(Australia) Ricky Ponting	196	1995–2012
7	(Australia) Mark Waugh	181	1991–2002
8	(England) Alastair Cook	175	2006–18
9	(New Zealand) Stephen Fleming	171	1994–2008
10	(South Africa) Graeme Smith	169	2002–14

Source: Cricinfo Statsguru. Last updated: 13 October 2026.

== See also ==
- Catch (baseball)
