= Foul out =

Foul out may refer to:

- Foul out (basketball)
- Foul out (baseball)
