= Appeal (cricket) =

Request in cricket to decide whether a batsman is out

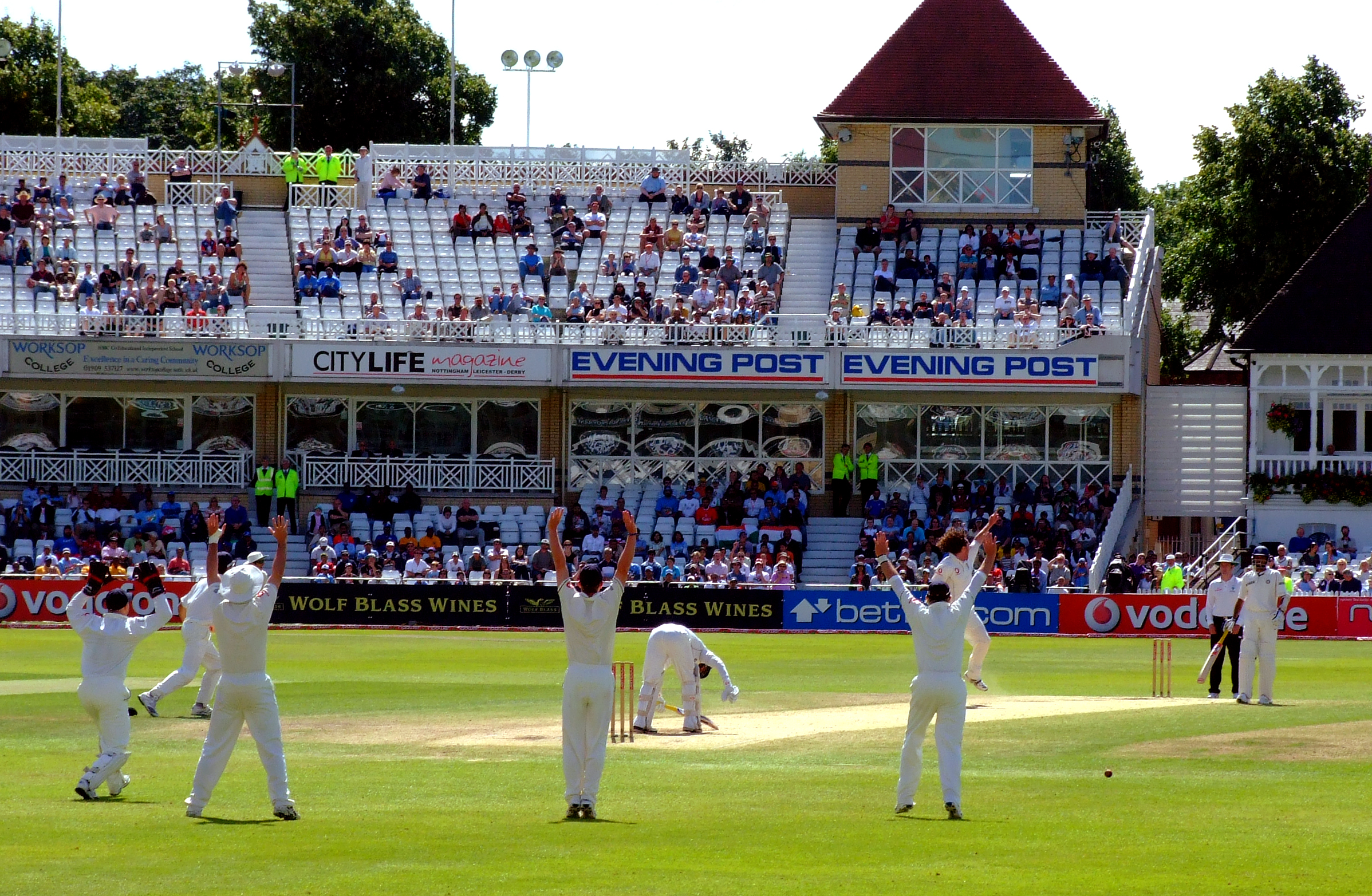
English players appeal for a leg before wicket in a Test match against India, 2007

In cricket, an appeal (locally known as a "Howzat") is the act of a player (or players) on the fielding team asking an umpire for a decision regarding whether a batter is out or not. According to Law 31 of the Laws of Cricket, an umpire will not rule a batter out unless the fielding side appeals for a decision. An appeal covers all forms of dismissal, regardless of what the fielding team believes they are appealing for. On occasions when a batter has otherwise technically been out, the fielding team has not realised, so did not appeal, and so the umpire has not declared them out. An appeal may be made at any point before the bowler starts their run-up for the next ball.

== Cricket rules ==
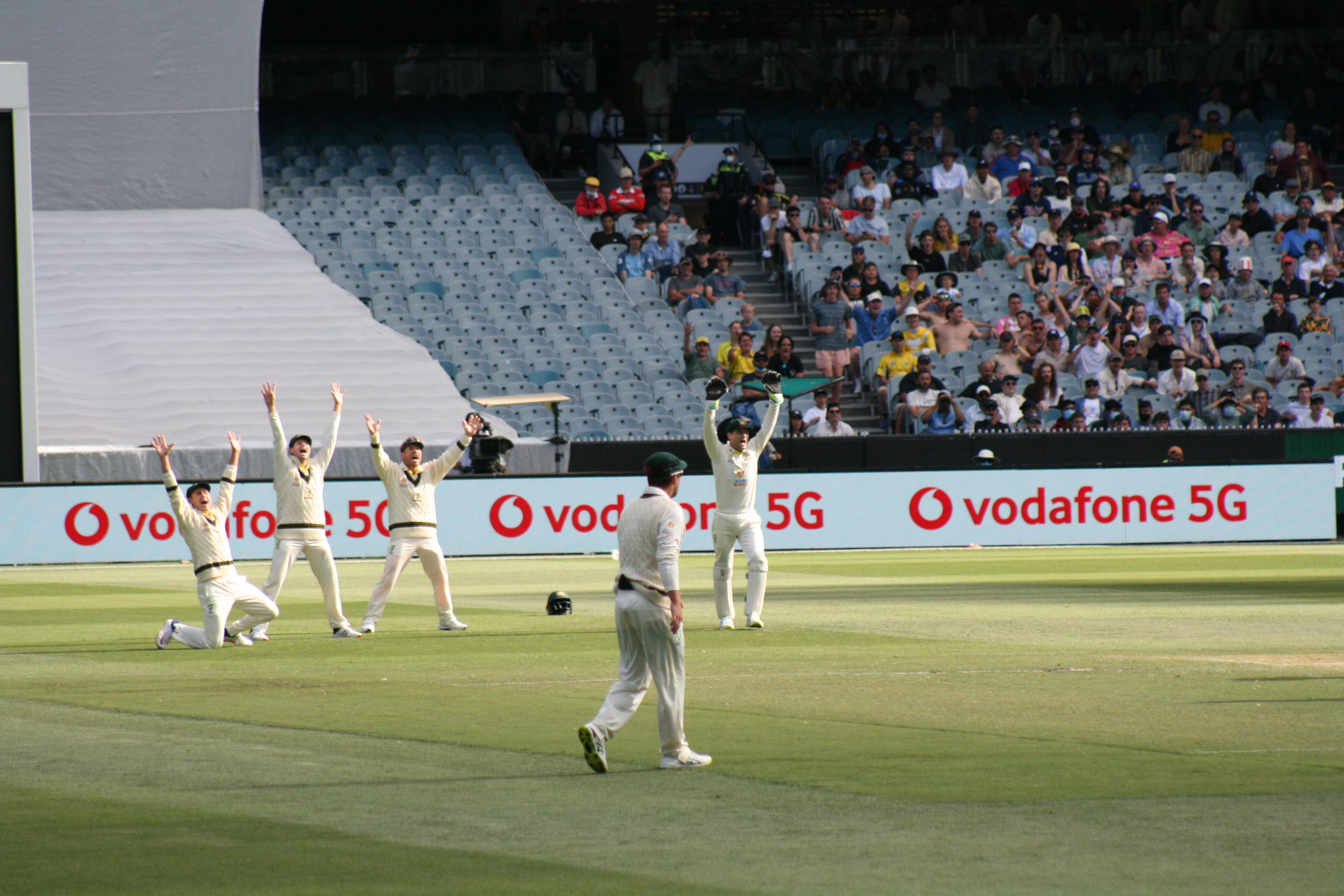
An appeal during the third Test match of the 2021–22 Ashes series

According to the Laws of Cricket, an appeal is a verbal query, usually in the form of, "How's that?" to an umpire. Since the taking of a wicket is an important event in the game, members of the fielding team often shout this phrase with great enthusiasm, and it has transmuted into the slightly abbreviated form, "Howzat?", often with a greatly extended final syllable. Sometimes one or other syllable is omitted entirely, the player emitting an elongated cry of simply "How?" or "Zat?". Sometimes, players may turn to the umpire and simply just shout or cheer. Players often also raise their arms or point towards the umpire as part of the appeal.

Although technically an appeal is required for the umpire to make a decision, in practice it is often obvious to all that a batter is out, and the batter may walk off the field without waiting for the decision of the umpire. This is often the case when a batter is bowled or obviously caught. However, the batter is always entitled to stand their ground and wait for a decision from the umpire. In cases where they consider they might not be out, such as a catch taken low near the grass or where it is not clear whether the ball hit the bat, batsmen will not take the walking option. It is then up to the fielding team to appeal for a decision. Sometimes a batter will walk even when it is not clear to others that they are out, if they know that they are. According to a common convention, this is considered to be the epitome of sportsmanship but, by another, it is potentially even disrespectful to the umpire to pre-empt their decision by walking.

== Decisions ==
Some decisions, such as leg before wicket, almost always require an appeal from the fielding side and the umpire's decision, as a batter will rarely preempt the umpire on what, in practice, requires fine judgment of several factors. Run-outs and stumpings are usually appealed and are decided by an umpire, unless the batter is very clearly out of their ground and obviously out.

Appealing is a verbal demand to the umpires that is mandatory to obtain a decision within the Laws of the game, and differs from sledging, which is voluntary, usually unwelcome, directed to the opposition team, and often intended to be offensive, intimidating or directly taunting to them.

== Unsportsmanlike appealing ==
Under the ICC Cricket Code of Conduct for the international professional game, it is considered unsportsmanlike to appeal excessively, i.e.

- repeatedly for the same decision
- repeatedly over time to press the umpires, especially when the player knows that the batter is not out
- moving in an intimidating manner towards an umpire
- celebrating without appealing, when an appeal is needed

Any such behaviour is considered a breach of the Spirit of Cricket and an offence that may result in warnings, penalty runs, even ultimately suspension or removal from the field of play -all as adjudicated and imposed by the umpires, and/or fines or match bans, as adjudicated and imposed by the match referee.

The Code does not disbar excitable action such as loud or enthusiastic appealing.

Under the standard Laws of Cricket that apply at all levels of the game unless modified, an equivalent on-field regime exists, but without such a precise codification of 'excessive appealing,' It is covered by Law 42.2.1 para 5 and 6.

In all codes of the game, continued appealing after the umpire has made the decision of 'not out' may be adjudged dissent, and dealt with even more seriously under Law 42.

== Examples of fielding side failing to appeal ==
Due to the manner of how other dismissals are achieved, it is the Run out and Stumping that are the common examples of a team failing to appeal. Sachin Tendulkar was once stumped whilst out of his ground in a match against England, but England failed to appeal, and he scored another 57 runs to finish on 91. In 2024 Australia playing the West Indies failed to appeal, or failed to appeal loudly enough for one of the umpires to hear, for a clear run-out by Spencer Johnson against Alzarri Joseph that would have ended the game, but had ultimately no impact due to the lopsided score line at the time. Shane Warne scored 5 runs against the Zimbabwean cricket team in Perth for the 1994–95 Australian Tri-Series. Four of them came when Warne blocked the ball back down the pitch to Heath Streak who threw down Warne's stumps, sending the ball flying to the boundary. In the disappointment of giving away the boundary 4, none of the Zimbabwean players appealed. Warne was caught out shortly after, and eventually Mark Waugh, batting down the order due to injury and Damien Fleming closed out the game for a win.

== See also ==
- Appeal play - a similar concept in baseball
- Cricket terminology
- Umpire Decision Review System
