= Appeal play =

Baseball term for fielders telling umpires of infraction

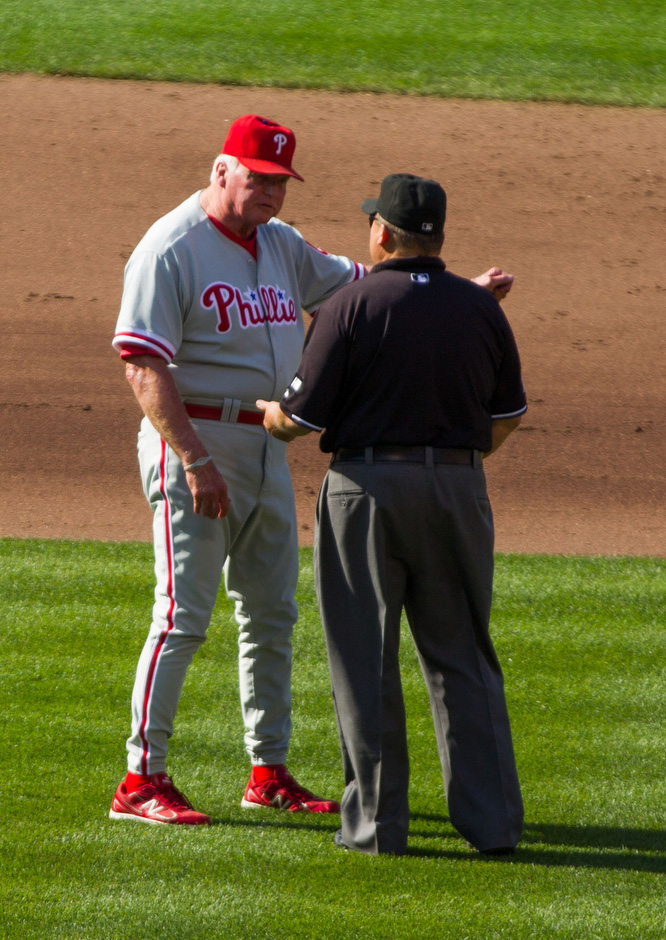
Charlie Manuel discusses a call with umpire Fieldin Culbreth.

In baseball, an appeal play occurs when a member of the defensive team calls the attention of an umpire to an infraction that they would otherwise ignore.

== Appeal play situations ==
A runner shall be called out, after a successful live ball appeal, if they:

- failed to tag up on a batted ball caught in-flight,
- failed to touch a base the last time they passed it, or
- failed to touch all previous bases in order

To properly execute a live ball appeal, a fielder must, with a live ball, tag the runner or base in question and communicate to the umpire what the infraction was and which runner committed the infraction. Such communication may be non-verbal, implicit, or assumed—so long as the intent of the fielder is clear to the umpire. Contrary to popular belief, an appeal out is not a force out unless it is regarding a missed force base. For example, if a runner from third base tags up and scores, but a runner from second base leaves too early, failing to tag up, and then is put out on the appeal, the run counts if it was scored before the appeal by the fielders. Rare situations with a viable appeal on a runner who misses his force base require the umpire to recognize an apparent fourth out.

== Legal and viable appeals ==
Fielders have the right to appeal any runner at any base they have reached or passed, at any time while the ball is alive, subject to the following restrictions:

- No live ball appeal may occur on a runner who misses home base (when not forced) and immediately attempts to correct his mistake; this runner must be tagged in order to be put out. (In running or sliding for home base, if the runner fails to touch home base and makes no attempt to return to the base, appeal can be made and touching home base will suffice.)
- When a running infraction occurs and then all playing action becomes relaxed, any live ball appeal must occur before the next pitch, play, or attempted play. An appeal itself does not count as an attempted play for the purposes of subsequent appeals.
- Once a fielder properly executes a legal live ball appeal on a runner, that runner may not again be appealed at that base, even if the appeal is for a different reason.

An appeal is legal if the fielder

- has the right to appeal a runner at a base,
- clearly communicates to the umpire what the infraction was, and
- tags the runner or base in question with a live ball.

Umpires will only rule on legal appeals. A potential appeal is viable if the appeal is legal and the umpire knows that the runner has indeed committed an infraction and will be called out if the appeal is executed by a fielder.

== Example: Multiple appeals ==
Suppose that runners are on first and third base, and the batter hits a fly ball. The runner on third tags up, leaving third base immediately after the outfielder touches the ball. The runner seems to score, beating the throw home, but failing to touch home plate. The runner proceeds into his dugout without again attempting to touch home base. The runner on first base stays at first base, and action becomes relaxed while the ball is in the infield.

The fielders now suspect that the runner left third base too early and also missed the plate. Suppose that a fielder, with the live ball, touches third base and tells the nearest umpire, "I think they left too early." This is a proper legal appeal, and the umpire should rule with a safe signal, perhaps saying, "No, they were fine." Now no legal appeal may again occur on that runner at third base. Suppose then that a fielder, with the live ball, touches home base and says to the nearest umpire, "I think they never touched home." This is a legal and viable appeal, and so the umpire should call the runner out and direct that his run shall not count.

Since the ball was live (and indeed must be for appeals to be legal), the runner from first could have attempted to advance at any time during the appeals. If the defense attempts to play on that runner, their opportunity to appeal the runner from third base is lost, and the run would count regardless of any subsequent attempt to appeal.

== Other appeals ==
A member of the defensive team may appeal to the umpire when a batter bats out of turn. The umpire then enforces the penalty for batting out of turn, if any. The ball must be live for this as for any appeal. After the appeal is made, the umpire will usually signal "Time" and figure out whether the appeal is successful.

When a batter appears to have swung at a pitch, but the plate umpire calls it a ball, a member of the defensive team (by rule the manager or catcher, though the pitcher often appeals and is usually recognized) may appeal for information from a base umpire with a better view of the pitch on whether the batter swung. The field umpire then signals whether the batter swung, and such a judgment must, by rule, prevail. The umpire asked is usually the first-base umpire (or third-base, if the batter is left-handed). The plate umpire is not required to ask for assistance if they believe the request is making a farce of the game. If the bat barely left the shoulder of the batter and the catcher appeals the "no-swing" call, the umpire will probably deny the appeal. This procedure was introduced because it is commonplace for a plate umpire to be unable to see some swings. A manager may ask an umpire to request assistance on other plays where another umpire had a better view, but the umpire is not required to do so. Such requests are common when a close home run or foul ball call is disputed, or when determining the accuracy of a close catch or no catch call.

An appeal may be executed if a fair ball becomes dead by leaving the playing field or becoming unplayable (home run, ground rule double, wild throw into stands/dugout, stuck in fence, drunk fan runs onto the field and steals the ball, etc.) if the defense believes a baserunner failed to touch a base before touching the next base to which they are entitled. For example, if the batter hits a ball which goes over the outfield fence in fair territory (whether a home run or ground rule double) but fails to touch first base before touching second base, they may not return to first base to correct their mistake once they have touched second, and they are out at first base if the defensive team appeals. In such a case, the plate umpire would put a new ball in play, and after the ball became live by rule, the defense could appeal the missed base. Again, the ball must be live.

In U.S. high school games or other games governed by NFHS rules, the defense may execute any of the live ball appeals above during a dead ball by simply communicating the infraction to the umpire, so it is never necessary to attempt a live ball appeal; it is always safer for the defense to ask for time to make the ball dead, and then make any requests to the umpire.

== See also ==
- Appeal (cricket)
