= Ground out (baseball) =

Method of putting a batter out

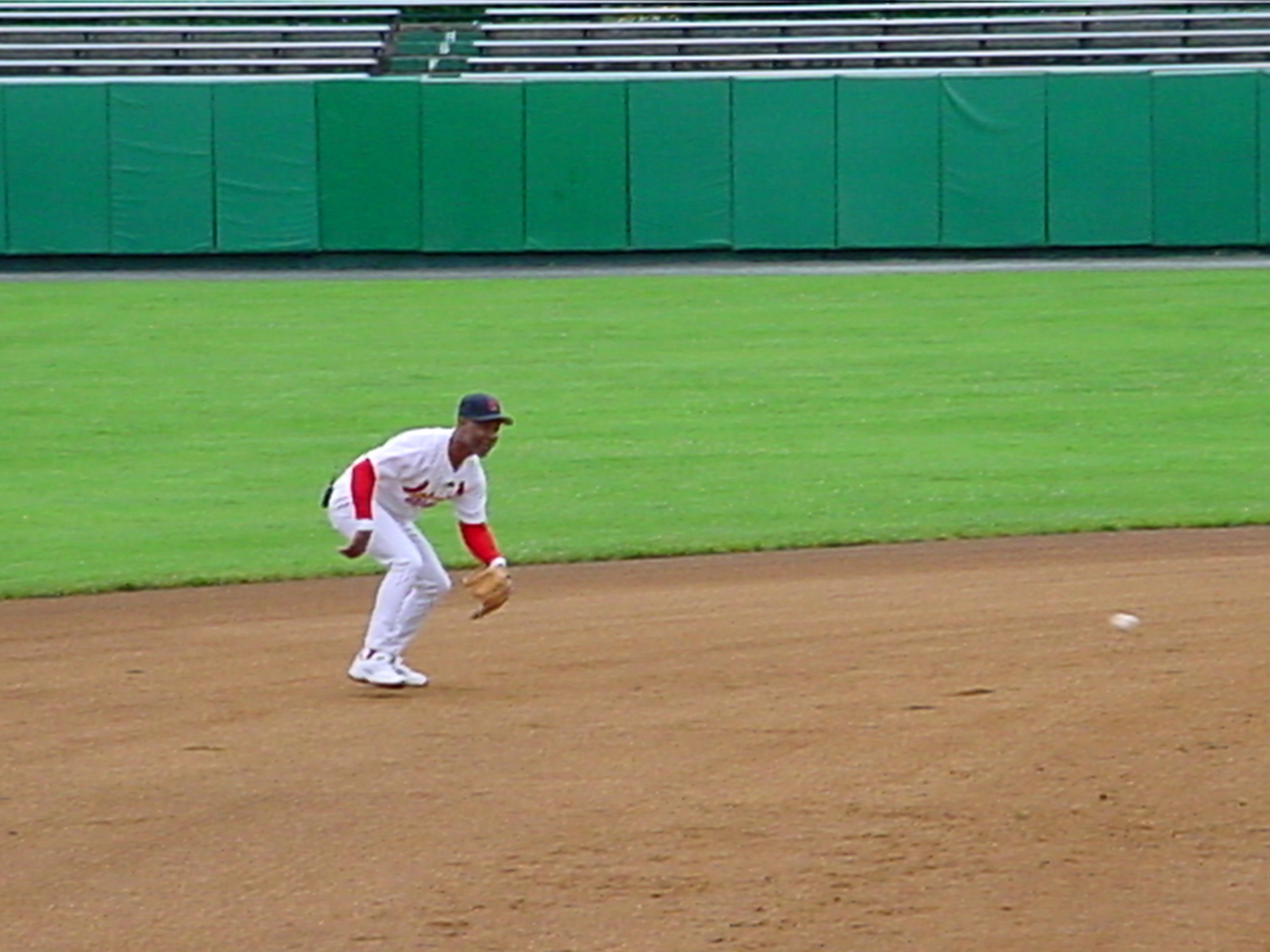
Ozzie Smith fielding a grounder during a ground out

A groundout is a method of putting out a batter in baseball. In such a play, a defensive player catches a batted ball hit on the ground by the batter and throws the ball to a defensive player at first base before the batter can successfully reach the base, or records an out elsewhere via a fielder's choice.

== Method ==
A batter is grounded out when a ball hits the ground immediately after being batted, commonly an infielder catches the ball and then throws it to a defensive player at first base to complete the out. The out is completed when the player at first base either catches the ball while touching first base or tags the batter, in both cases, before the batter successfully reaches the base.

== Double play ==
If the defensive players put out one baserunner during the same play in which a batter grounds out, the defensive team records a "double play". There are other means of recording a double play that do not entail a groundout.

== Triple play ==
If the defensive players put out two baserunners during the same play in which a batter grounds out, the defensive team records a "triple play", the maximum possible outs that can be recorded on a single play. There are other means of recording a triple play that do not entail a ground out.
