= Tag up =

Baseball maneuver

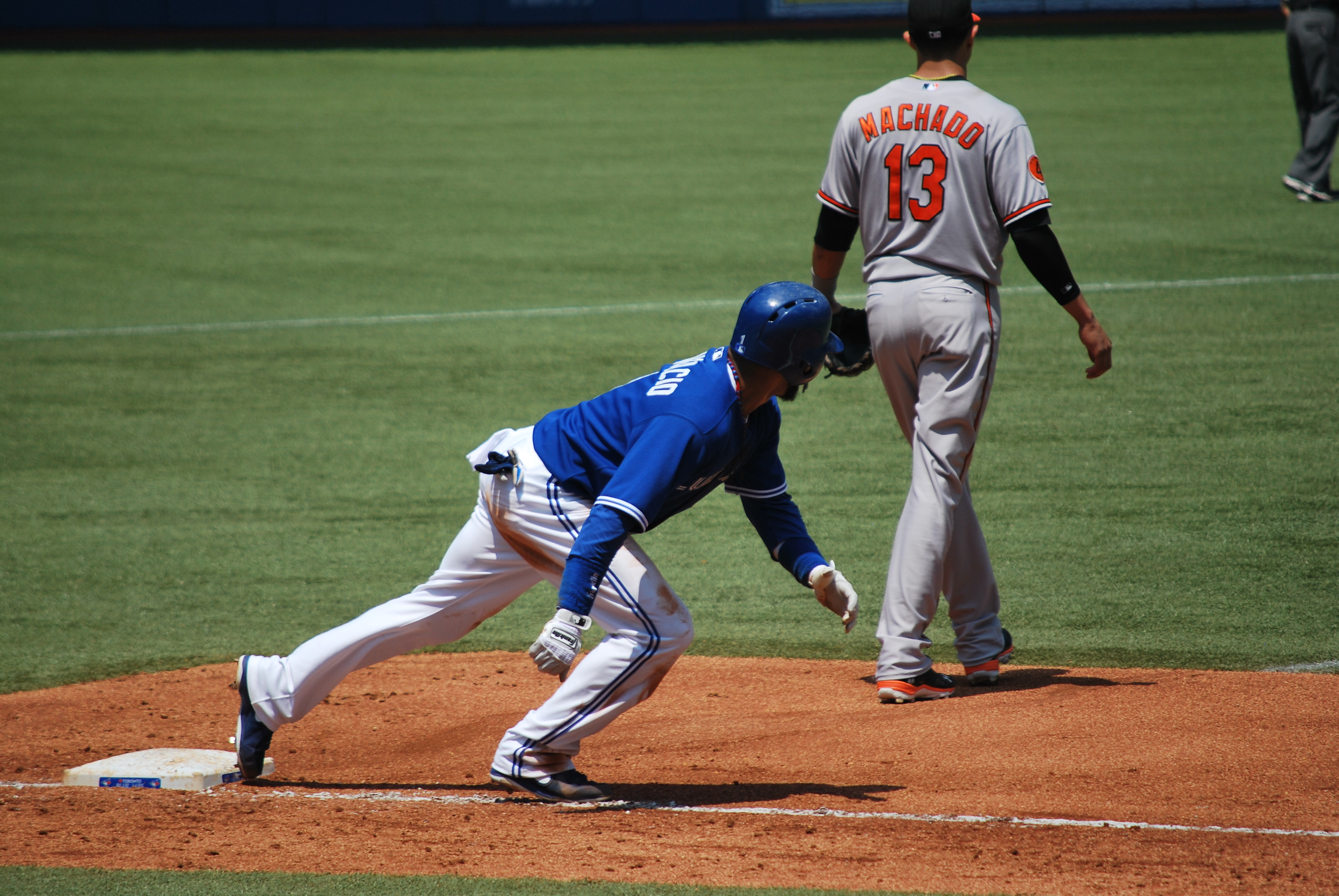
Toronto Blue Jays second baseman Emilio Bonifacio tags up at third base during a game against the Baltimore Orioles in 2013

In baseball, to tag up is for a baserunner to retouch or remain on their starting base (the time-of-pitch base) until (after) the ball is first touched by a fielder. By rule, baserunners must tag up when a hit ball is caught by a fielder before it bounces, and in such situations, the baserunners are out if any fielder with possession of the ball touches their starting base before they do. After a legal tag up, runners are free to try to advance, even if the ball was caught in foul territory. On long fly ball outs, runners can often gain a base. When a runner scores by these means, it is known as a sacrifice fly. On short fly balls, runners rarely attempt to advance after tagging up, due to the high risk of being thrown out.

== Putting out a runner who is required to tag up ==
When a baserunner fails to tag up on a caught fly ball (for instance, if they started running too early, thinking the ball would not be caught), they may be "doubled up/off", which results in them being called out. To double a runner off, a fielder must touch the runner's starting base while in possession of the ball, before the runner returns to the base. If the baserunner appeared to tag up, but a fielder suspects the baserunner may have left the base too early (thus failing to legally tag up), the fielder can attempt to double the runner off by touching the runner's starting base while controlling the ball, before the next pitch is thrown. This is considered a type of appeal play. If the umpire agrees that the runner did not retouch after the ball was touched by a fielder, the umpire will call the runner out, and anything else the runner did during the play (such as score a run) is negated. Doubling a runner off is considered a "time play" (as opposed to a force play), meaning even if the doubling-off is the third out of an inning, any runs which score before the double-off will count (unless the run was scored by the same runner that was doubled off, causing the run to not count in any situation).
