= Batting (baseball) =

Baseball offensive act of facing the pitcher and attempting to hit the ball into play

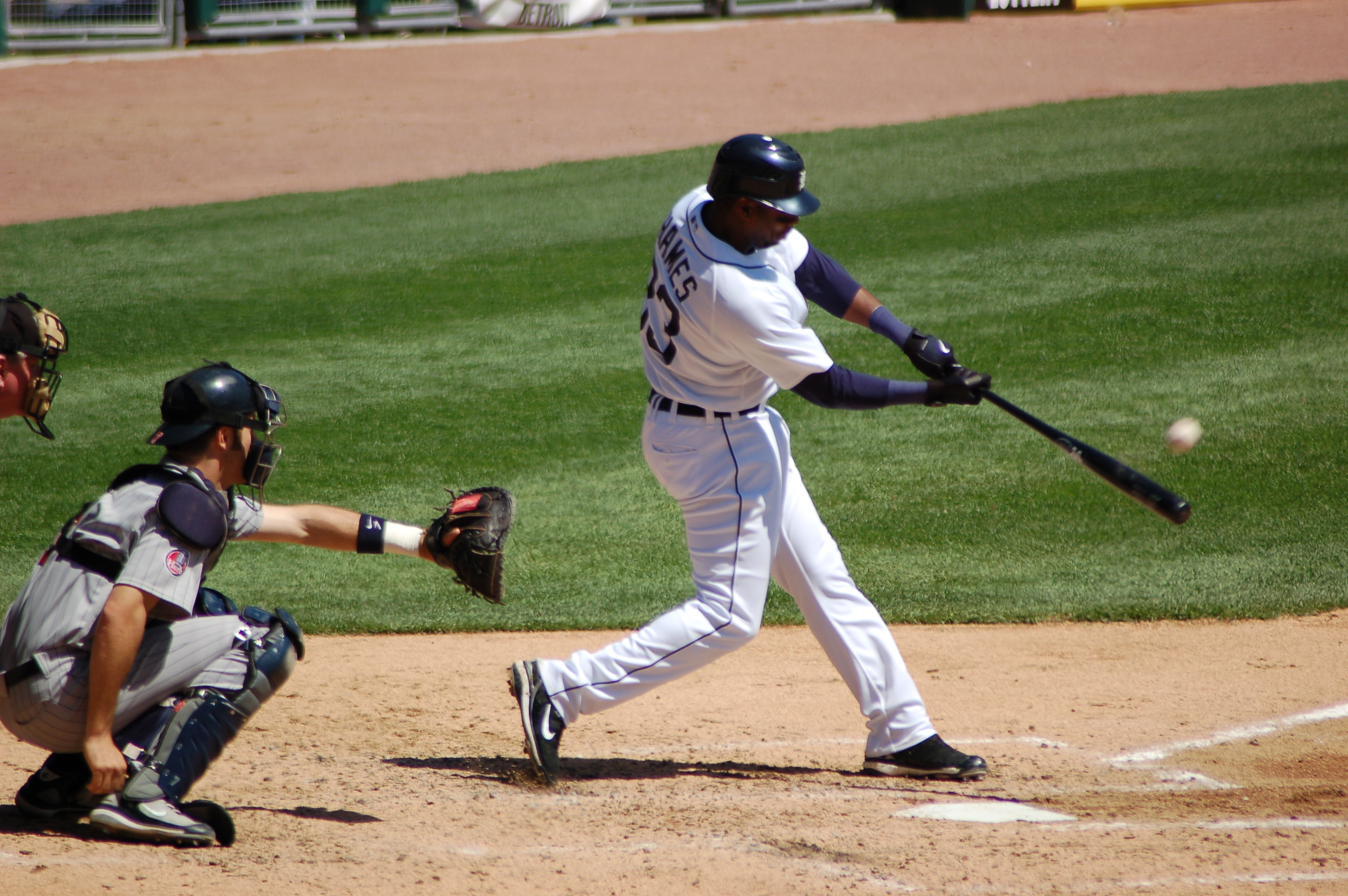
Marcus Thames of the Detroit Tigers batting in 2007

In baseball, batting is the act of facing the opposing pitcher and trying to produce offense for one's team. A batter or hitter is a person whose turn it is to face the pitcher. The three main goals of batters are to become a baserunner, to drive runners home or to advance runners along the bases for others to drive home, but the techniques and strategies they use to do so vary. Hitting uses a motion which is virtually unique to baseball and its fellow bat-and-ball sports, one that is rarely used in other sports. Hitting is unique because it involves rotating in the horizontal plane of movement, unlike most sports movements which occur in the vertical plane.

== Goals ==
In general, batters try to get hits. However, their primary objective is to avoid making an out, and helping their team score runs. There are several ways they can help their team score runs. They may draw a walk if they receive and do not swing the bat at four pitches located outside the strike zone. In cases when there is a runner on third and fewer than two outs, they can attempt to hit a sacrifice fly to drive the runner in by allowing the runner on third to tag up and score. When there are fewer than two outs and runners on base, they can try to sacrifice bunt to advance the runner(s) or, with a runner on first or with runners on first and third, they can try a hit and run play, also designed to advance the runner(s). They might even be hit by a pitch, reach on an error or—if first is empty or there are two outs—on a dropped third strike.

The defense attempts to get the batter out. The pitcher's main role in this is to throw the ball in such a way that the batter either strikes out or cannot hit it cleanly so the defense can get him out.

== Success in batting ==
Batting is often cited as one of the most difficult feats in sports because it consists of hitting a small round ball, usually moving at high velocity, with a thin round bat. Batters getting a hit in three out of ten at bats, giving him a batting average of .300 (pronounced "three hundred") are considered a successful hitter. In Major League Baseball, no batter has had over a .400 average at the end of the season since Ted Williams' .406 in 1941, and no batter has ever hit over .367 in a lifetime—Ty Cobb hit .3664. In modern times, the statistic on-base plus slugging (OPS) is seen as a more accurate measure of a player's ability as a batter; this stat combines the player's on-base percentage (a percentage of their plate appearances where the batter gets on base), with the player's slugging percentage (an average of total bases with at-bats). An OPS at or near 1.000 is considered to be the mark of an exceptional hitter. A sustained OPS at or above 1.000 over a career is a feat only a few hitters have ever been able to reach.

== Strategy ==
Hiroshima Toyo Carp player 38, Masato Akamatsu, batting a ball

Batters vary in their approach at the plate. Some are aggressive hitters, usually swinging at the first pitch (as pitchers often attempt to throw a first-pitch strike). Others are patient, attempting to work the pitch count in order to observe all the types of pitches a pitcher will use, as well as tire out the pitcher by forcing him to throw many pitches early. Generally, contact hitters are more aggressive, swinging at pitches within the strike zone, whereas power hitters will lay off borderline strikes in order to get a pitch they can drive for extra bases.

== Warming up ==
In preparation of hitting, every baseball player has their own particular warm-up routine. Warming up before the game is usually done as a team, at the amateur level, and focuses on helping the hitter get in the correct mindset to hit the ball. The most notable drill used is the "Tee Drill", where batters hit a ball off a baseball tee and correct any issues they found during previous games or practices. There are also various hitting devices used during warm-up in the "on deck circle" to try to increase the batter's bat velocity. The over weighted supplemental devices include swinging multiple bats, standard 23 oz softball bat, heavier 26 oz softball bat, lighter 18 oz softball bat and doughnut ring (16 oz). Weighted warm-up devices are commonly used because players feel that warming-up with heavier bats will help them increase bat velocity. After the warm-up with a heavier bat, the normal bat seems lighter and players feel they can swing it faster. The effect of these devices is not only mental, but it may also be physical. Heavy warm-up loads stimulate the neural system, allowing for increased muscle activation during lighter bat swings. The use of weighted bats is based on the theory of complex training where sets of heavier and lighter resistances are alternated to increase muscle performance. This theory revolves around the idea that muscle contractions are stronger after reaching near maximal contractions. The postactivation potentiation improves motor neuron pool excitability and increases the number of recruited motor units, both leading to greater power output. The additional weight may also help strengthen the muscles of the forearms and wrist thus increasing bat velocity, though some evidence suggests that the effect is psychological rather than biomechanical.

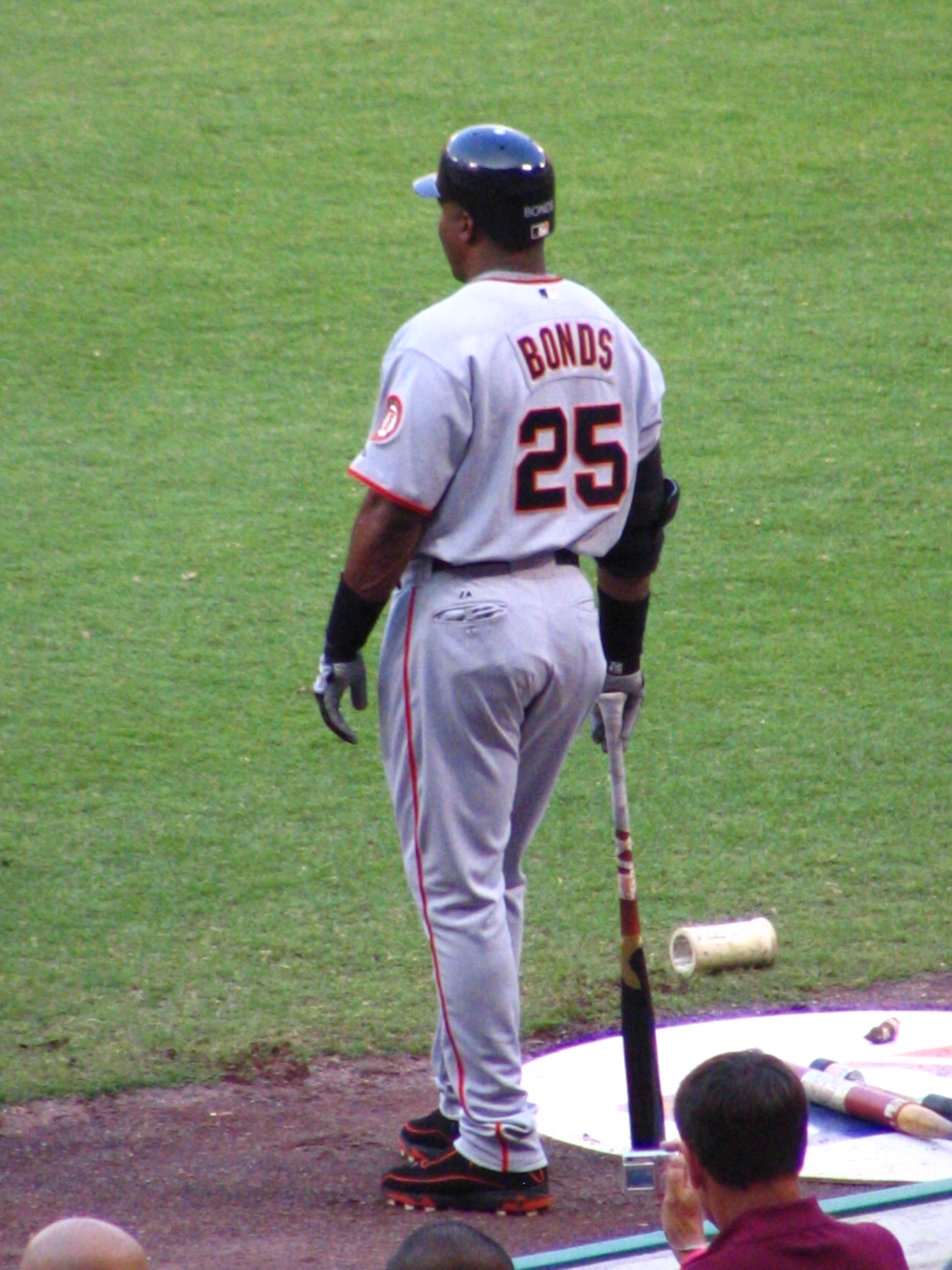
Barry Bonds in the on deck circle with various warm up devices

== The lineup ==
The lineup or batting order is a list of the nine baseball players for a team in the order they will bat. During the game, the only way to change the lineup is via substitution, as batting out of turn is not allowed. Once the ninth person in the lineup finishes batting, the first person bats again; this is the top of the order. Lineups are designed to facilitate manufacturing runs. Depending on batters' skills, they might be placed in different parts of the lineup. Of course, when it comes down to it, all batters are attempting to create runs for the team.

The player currently batting in a game is said to be at the plate, at bat, or up to bat (shortened to up). To keep the game moving at an orderly pace, the next batter due up waits to take his turn in a circle (actually marked or imaginary) between his team's dugout or bench and the batter's box, and is said to be on deck, with the circle known as the on deck circle. The player in the batting order after the on deck batter is said to be in the hole.

== Types of hitters ==
- Power hitters: power hitters, or sluggers, are batters who drive the ball, usually hitting home runs and other extra-base hits, but tend to strike out more often than contact hitters. See also slugging percentage.
- Pull hitters: batters who tend to hit the ball to the same side of the field as the side of the plate they are standing on.
- Opposite field hitting Hitters: batters who are able to delay their swing by a fraction of a second so as to drive the ball in the side of the field opposite from the side of the plate they are standing on. Opposite field hitting does not come naturally to most batters, and not many players have the bat control necessary for opposite field hitting. Derek Jeter is well known for his ability as an opposite field hitter.
- Contact hitters: batters who do not strike out often and are able to frequently put the ball in play. They tend to hit fewer home runs than power hitters. Luis Arraez is known for his extremely high contact rate, resulting in few strikeouts, home runs, or walks.
- Slap hitters: slap hitters are batters who rarely try to drive the ball. Instead these hitters simply attempt to "slap" the ball through the infielders to reach base.
- Complete hitters: players who can not only slap the ball, but can come up with extra base hits.
- Designated hitters: used as a batting substitute for the pitcher. The designated hitter role was adopted by the American League in 1973, and was only in effect in AL ballparks. As of 2022, the rule also applies to National League teams.
- Switch hitters: capable of batting left or right-handed
- Pinch hitters: a substitute hitter for the scheduled batter in the lineup. A DH acts as a permanent pinch hitter for the pitcher. Once a pinch hitter bats, he will replace the previous batter in the lineup unless a substitution is made. Prior to the onset of the universal DH, NL teams occasionally used pinch hitters in place of pitchers when not playing in an AL ballpark; commonly this involves a double switch.

== History of the bat ==
When baseball was in its beginning years, players made their own bats. This allowed players to experiment with different shapes and sizes of the bats. It did not take long for players to realize that the best bats were those with rounded barrels. Wooden bats are rare at most levels other than the pros. The majority of wooden baseball bats today are made from northern white ash harvested from Pennsylvania or New York. White ash is used because of its hardness, durability, strength, weight and feel. Trees that provide the lumber for baseball bats are often 50 years old, and of all the lumber harvested, the top 10 percent is saved for pro bats. Recent technology in drying wood has created bats with lower moisture content, which are light enough to make effective baseball bats. Rock or Sugar Maple bats are preferred. Maple bats cost more than white ash, but they often last longer as a result of their high strength.

== Types of bats ==
In addition to the Louisville Slugger, there are many other types of bats that have been used throughout the history of baseball.

Player and Event	Type of Bat Used
Barry Bonds sets all-time home run record	Sam Bat
Mike Piazza breaks all-time home run mark for catcher	Mizuno Corporation
Sammy Sosa hits 500th home run	Easton (BRG Sports)
Mark McGwire sets single-season home run record	Rawlings (company)
Babe Ruth hits 3 home runs in one game	Hillerich & Bradsby

The introduction of aluminum baseball bats in the 1970s forever changed the game of baseball at every level but the professional. Aluminum bats are lighter and stronger than wooden bats. Due to the trampoline effect that occurs when a baseball hits an aluminum bat, they can hit a ball significantly further than wooden bats can.

In light of the increase in power of composite and alloy bats, the NCAA and NFHS have adopted more stringent standards regarding the use of composite and alloy bats. The new BBCOR (Bat-Ball Coefficient of Restitution) standard brought the flexibility of composite and alloy bats more in line with their wooden counterparts, reducing the trampoline effect. The NCAA changed standards at the start of the 2011 season, and NFHS adopted the same standard for the 2012 baseball season.

== Bat design ==
The design of bats also continues to evolve as manufacturers search for ways to magnify the trampoline effect and increase the size of the bat's "sweet spot." In aluminum bats, a double-walled bat was introduced in the late 1990s. This design comprises an outer wall of scandium-aluminum, an inner wall of a composite material, and a "filling of rubber or a thick fluid between the two walls.

== See also ==
- Batting (cricket)
- Checked swing
