= Batting order =

Batting order may refer to:

- Batting order (baseball), the sequence in which the members of the offense bat against the pitcher
- Batting order (cricket), the sequence in which batters play through their team's innings
