= Batting position =

Batting position is a player's position on the batting order and may refer to:

- Batting order (cricket)
- Batting order (baseball)
