= Batting order (baseball) =

Sequence in which the members of the offense bat against the pitcher

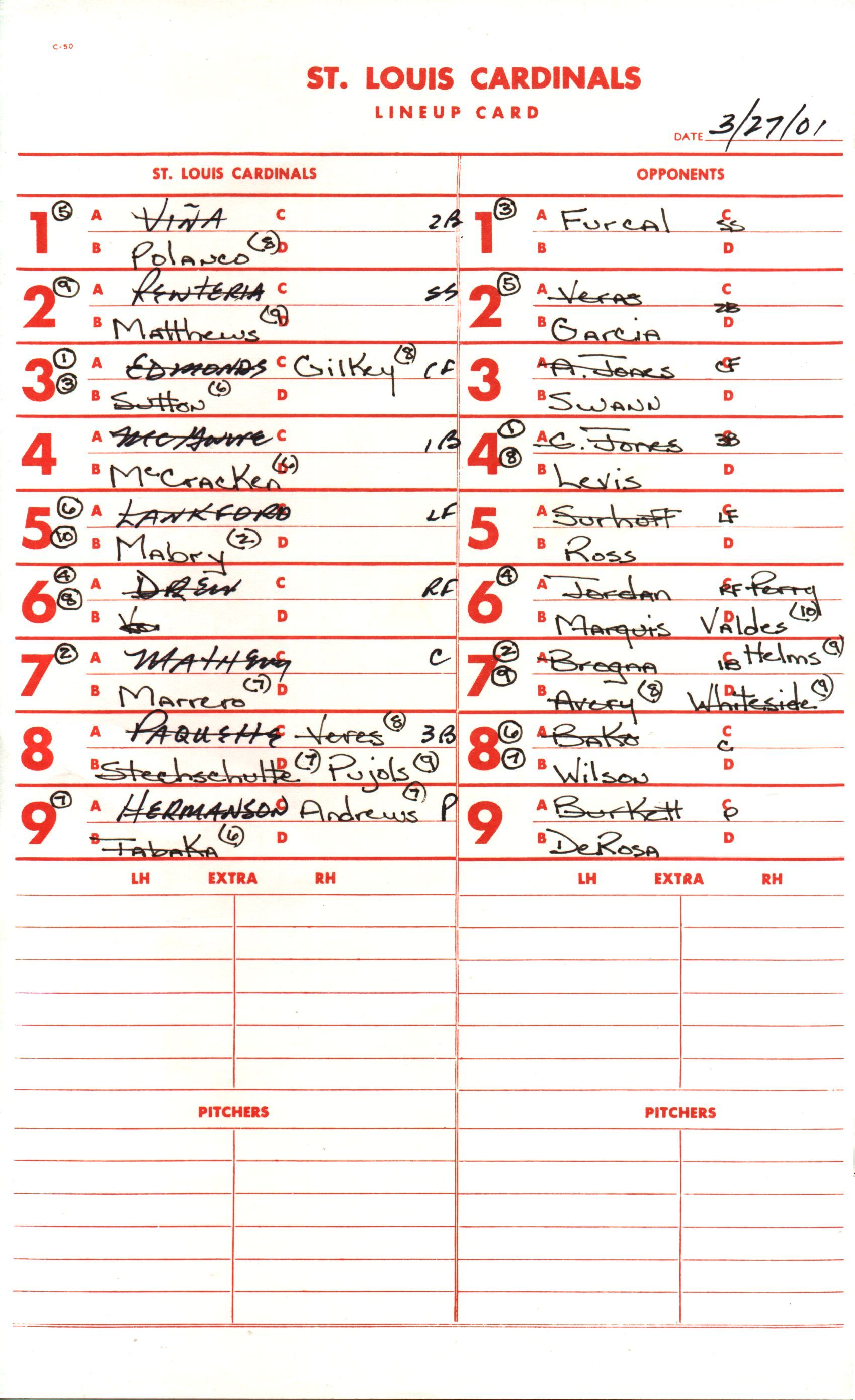
Lineup card from a 2001 spring training game between the St. Louis Cardinals and Atlanta Braves

In baseball, the batting order or batting lineup is the sequence in which the members of the offense take their turns in batting against the pitcher. The batting order is the main component of a team's offensive strategy. In Major League Baseball, the batting order is set by the manager, who before the game begins must present the home plate umpire with two copies of his team's lineup card, a card on which a team's starting batting order is recorded. The home plate umpire keeps one copy of the lineup card of each team, and gives the second copy to the opposing manager. Once the home plate umpire gives the lineup cards to the opposing managers, the batting lineup is final and a manager can make changes only under the Official Baseball Rules governing substitutions. If a team bats out of order, it is a violation of baseball's rules and subject to penalty.

According to The Dickson Baseball Dictionary, a team has "batted around" when each of the nine batters in the team's lineup has made a plate appearance, and the first batter is coming up again during a single inning. Dictionary.com, however, defines "bat around" as "to have every player in the lineup take a turn at bat during a single inning." It is not an official statistic. Opinions differ as to whether nine batters must get an at-bat, or if the opening batter must bat again for "batting around" to have occurred.

In modern American baseball, some batting positions have nicknames: "leadoff" for first, "cleanup" for fourth, and "last" for ninth. Others are known by the ordinal numbers or the term #-hole (3rd place hitter would be 3-hole). In similar fashion, the third, fourth, and fifth batters are often collectively referred to as the "heart" or "meat" of the batting order, while the seventh, eighth, and ninth batters are called the "bottom of the lineup," a designation generally referring both to their hitting position and to their typical lack of offensive prowess.

At the start of each inning, the batting order resumes where it left off in the previous inning; it does not reset to start with the #1 hitter again. If the current batter did not finish his at-bat during the previous inning (because another baserunner becomes the third out, by being picked-off or caught stealing), he will lead off the next inning with the pitch count reset to 0-0. While this ensures that the players all bat roughly the same number of times, the game will almost always end before the last cycle is complete, so that the #1 hitter (for example) almost always has one plate appearance more than the #9 hitter, which is a significant enough difference to affect tactical decisions. This is not a perfect correlation to each batter's official count of "at-bats," as a sacrifice (bunt or fly) that advances a runner, or a walk (base on balls or hit by pitch) is not recorded as an "at-bat" as these are largely out of the batter's control, and does not hurt his batting average (base hits per at-bats.)

== History ==
=== Development of the set batting order ===
Early forms of baseball or rounders from the mid 19th century did not require a fixed batting order; any player who was not on base could be called upon to bat. The concept of a set batting order is said to have been invented by Alexander Cartwright, who also instituted rules such as the foul ball and tagging the runner (as opposed to pegging him with the ball), and devised the shortstop position. In the early days of baseball, the rules did not require that the batting order be announced before game time. This permitted strategic decisions regarding batting order to occur while the game was in progress. For example, Cap Anson was known to wait to see if the first two men got on base in the first inning. If they did not, he would wait and hit in the next inning. However, in the 1880s, organized baseball began mandating that the batting order be disclosed before the first pitch.

For example, Rule 36 ("The Batsman's Position--Order of Batting") in The Playing Rules of Professional Base Ball Clubs of 1896 stated the following: "The Batsmen must take their positions within the batsmen's lines ... in the order in which they are named in the batting order, which batting order must be submitted by the Captains of the opposing teams to the Umpire before the game, and this batting order must be followed except in the case of a substitute player, in which case the substitute must take the place of the original player in the batting order. After the first inning the first striker in each inning shall be the batsman whose name follows that of the last man who completed his turn ... in the preceding inning."

=== Contrast with cricket ===
In cricket, the batting order is generally fixed so that players are sure of their role within the team, but there is no obligation to submit a definitive batting order and stick to it. A batsman can be "promoted" to a higher spot (or conversely, demoted to a lower one) in the batting order according to the team's wishes.

The idea of a "revolving" batting order is unique to baseball, in which the on-deck batter at the time the final out is made in one inning becomes the lead-off batter (unless the current batter had not been struck-out or put a ball in play, in which case he returns as the lead-off batter with a 0-0 reset pitch count) in the next inning (unless his spot is taken by a pinch-hitter).

In the shorter form of cricket, there is only one innings per side, while in the longer form each side bats a maximum of two times. In a typical innings of this latter form, all eleven players on the team will have a chance to bat, and the innings finishes when 10 players are out. In the team's second innings, the batting order is usually maintained, but the team can make any changes it desires.

As in baseball, many batting order configurations are possible, but a standard order might be:

- Two opening batsmen - able players who can negotiate a typically difficult period of play.
- Four middle order batsmen - specialist batsmen who may be more attacking.
- A wicket-keeper - the equivalent of the catcher, who is also expected to contribute with the bat.
- Four bowlers - the equivalent of pitchers; players who may or may not have any ability with the bat.

The concept of a batting order in baseball is "profoundly democratic; no matter how good a hitter you are, you have to wait your turn." In that respect, although baseball, like cricket, "may have begun as a gentlemen's game," Americans gravitated toward baseball as a better embodiment of the country's egalitarian ideal, and as a symbol of cultural as well as political independence from the British colonial legacy.

- The closest equivalent in cricket would be the 20% limit on the number of overs (sets of consecutive pitches) that a player can deliver in a one-day game; these force teams to have at least 5 players who can bowl parts of the inning.

However, it should also be remembered that in cricket a single innings lasts hours or even days, and there are periods in which batting can be markedly easier or more difficult. A related factor is that a single ball is used in an innings for around 80 overs (approximately 5 hours of play). At the beginning of an innings, therefore, when bowlers are fresh and the ball is hard, it would be appreciably more challenging for the non-specialist batsmen to make an impact. Conversely, if such a player bats when the ball is old and the bowlers are tired, he can thrive, and this can often be a great source of pleasure to spectators, as insult is added to injury for the other side.

Finally, in cricket, there is no such thing as a designated hitter, so even if a bowler has no batting ability, he will still be required to bat, usually as the last man in the order.

== Positions in the lineup ==
=== Batter #1 ===
The first player in the batting order is known as the leadoff hitter. The leadoff batter is traditionally an individual with a high on-base percentage, plate discipline, bat control, good speed, and the ability to steal bases. His goal is to ensure the team has baserunners when the later, more powerful hitters come to bat. Once on base, his main goal is to get into scoring position (that is, 2nd or 3rd base) as quickly as possible, either through steals, hit and run plays or intelligent baserunning decisions, and then on to score.

His need for a high on-base percentage (OBP) exceeds that of the other lineup spots. Because leadoff hitters are selected primarily for their speed and ability to reach base, they are typically not power hitters, but contact hitters. Leadoff hitters typically hit mostly singles and doubles and draw walks to get on base. Although speed is not essential, as was shown by Wade Boggs, it is highly desired among leadoff hitters.

However, today's model for a leadoff hitter developed only gradually. An early "job description" for a leadoff hitter by baseball pioneer Henry Chadwick in 1867 advised only, "Let your first striker always be the coolest hand of the nine." By 1898, though, a Sporting Life article noted, "It is customary to have a small, active fellow who can hit, run and steal bases, and also worry a pitcher into a preliminary base on balls, as a leader in the list."

Examples of classic leadoff hitters are Phil Rizzuto, Richie Ashburn, Maury Wills, Lou Brock, Pete Rose, Rod Carew, Tim Raines, and Ichiro Suzuki, with some having somewhat more power (Dick McAuliffe, Lou Whitaker, Rickey Henderson, Paul Molitor, Derek Jeter, Carlos Gómez, Gerardo Parra, Johnny Damon).

The term “leadoff hitter” can be used interchangeably to describe not only the first batter on the lineup card, but also the first batter up in any particular inning. For example, if, in the second inning, the fifth batter in the lineup card is the first batter up, it will be said that he is leading off or that he is the leadoff batter for that particular inning.

=== #2 ===
The second batter is usually a contact hitter with the ability to bunt or sacrifice a baserunner over or get a hit. His main goal is to move the leadoff man into scoring position and to avoid grounding into double plays. Managers often like to have a left-handed hitter bat second because of the potential gap in the infield defense caused by the first baseman holding the leadoff batter. As early as 1892, it was recognized that a left-handed hitter in the second spot would make it easier for a man on base to steal second. On a very good team this batter can have characteristics of both a leadoff hitter and a power hitter (Manny Machado, Curt Flood, Joe Morgan, Christian Yelich, Robin Yount, Alan Trammell, Ryne Sandberg, Aaron Judge, Freddie Freeman), in some such cases abandoning the advantage of having a left-hand hitter in favor of a good right-handed hitter.

=== #3 ===
The third batter, in the three-hole, is generally the best all-around hitter on the team, often hitting for a high batting average but not necessarily very fast. Part of his job is to reach base for the cleanup hitter, and part of it is to help drive in baserunners himself. Third-place hitters are best known for "keeping the inning alive". However, in recent years, some managers have tended to put their best slugger in this position.

Typically the greatest hitters for a combination of power and OBP on their teams bat third, as is shown by the use of such hitters as Rogers Hornsby, Babe Ruth, Stan Musial, Mel Ott, Ted Williams, Tony Gwynn, Willie Mays, Chipper Jones, Barry Bonds, Mickey Mantle, Carl Yastrzemski, Duke Snider, Albert Pujols, Joey Votto, Andrew McCutchen, Miguel Cabrera, Ken Griffey Jr., Ryan Braun, Josh Hamilton, Evan Longoria, José Bautista, Aaron Judge, Mike Trout, and Hank Aaron in this position in the lineup. Even without the combination of extreme power (Yogi Berra, Al Kaline, George Brett) or high batting average (Ernie Banks, Harmon Killebrew, Johnny Bench, Mike Schmidt, Reggie Jackson) this batting position contains an inordinate number of hitters who eventually become members of the Baseball Hall of Fame.

=== #4 ===
The fourth player in the batting order is known as the cleanup hitter, also known as the cleanup spot, and in modern baseball is almost always one of the best hitters on the team, often the one with the most power and ability to drive in runs with extra-base hits (double, triple, or home run). Baseball managers tend to place hitters who are most likely to reach base ahead of the clean-up man, so that the fourth batter can "clean" the bases by driving these baserunners home to score runs. His main goal is to drive in runs, although he is expected to score runs as well. Hitting cleanup requires an exceptional level of talent, and the ability to deliver big hits in important situations (such as the bases loaded with two out). Examples of #4 hitters include Edgar Martínez, Lou Gehrig, Joe DiMaggio, Eddie Mathews, Norm Cash, Willie McCovey, Billy Williams, Tony Pérez, Fred McGriff, Eddie Murray, Daniel Murphy, Alex Rodriguez, Prince Fielder, David Ortiz, and Ryan Howard.

The theory behind the cleanup hitter is that, at the beginning of the game, if at least one of the first three batters reaches base with a single-base hit or walk, a home run will result in two or more runs rather than just one (a "solo" home run). If all three players reach base, thereby loading the bases, the cleanup hitter has the chance to hit a grand slam, scoring four runs. But even without the grand slam, this batter can extend an inning with a high batting average and frequent walks.

However, since home runs were a rarity before 1920, the concept of slotting a home run hitter fourth was slow to develop. Regardless, the need for a good run producer in that position was recognized from the early days in baseball history, as demonstrated by player-manager Cap Anson generally penciling his name there. As power came to play a larger role in the game, the tendency to bat home run hitters fourth developed accordingly. In 1904, sportswriter Tim Murnane stated unequivocally that "The heavy hitter of the team is located at the fourth place."

The #3 and #4 hitters can often be switched in roles. For example, the 2011 Detroit Tigers had Miguel Cabrera as their #4 hitter but moved him to the #3 hitter after acquiring Prince Fielder as a free agent before the 2012 season.

=== #5, #6 ===
The fifth and sixth (and sometimes seventh) batters have traditionally been RBI men, with the main goal of driving runners home, especially with sacrifice flies. The 3rd, 4th and 5th hitters in the lineup are called the "heart of the order", signifying their collective ability to get on base, hit for power and drive in runs. Modern sabermetric baseball theories suggests that even the 5th and 6th batters should have high on-base percentages, though this approach has not been universally adopted. The fifth batter is usually a team's second-best power hitter, and his purpose is often to "protect" the clean-up hitter in the batting order. He is expected to pose enough of a threat that the opposing team refrains from intentionally walking the clean-up hitter in potential scoring situations. The sixth hitter serves as a backup to the fifth hitter in case he fails to score runs or to drive more in himself if another scoring opportunity presents itself.

=== #7, #8 ===
The seventh and eighth batters are often not as powerful as the earlier batters, and do not have as high a batting average. They are often players who are in the lineup more because of their defensive ability (typically catcher, second baseman or shortstop) than their ability as hitters. They are still expected to produce (as is the case for any regular starter), but they have less pressure in those spots. The main pressure on the eighth hitter comes when there are two outs: in this case, he must battle the pitcher to get on base so that the ninth hitter can come up. That way, even if the ninth hitter gets out, the top of the order comes up next. Very often the #7 hitter is a catcher, commonly the slowest baserunner on a team whose lack of speed would contribute to a large number of double plays higher in the order even if he is a good hitter (Bill Freehan). The eighth batter is often a good contact hitter, and can be used as a back-up #2 hitter. In leagues without designated hitters (DHs), the catcher often bats eighth, as they are often employed for their defensive skills and handling of the pitching staff, and tend to have a relatively low batting average. However, this is by no means always the case. In a situation where the pitcher is batting in the #9 slot, #8 hitters are sometimes intentionally walked to get to the pitcher's spot in the #9 hole; however, with two outs the opposing pitcher is expected to battle the #8 hitter, so in the event of an out the pitcher leads off the following inning.

=== #9 ===
The nine hole is traditionally meant for people that struggle to bat.

In leagues where the DH rule is not in effect, the starting pitcher almost always fills the ninth spot, although relief pitchers may occupy a different spot due to a double switch. If there is a man on first or second base with fewer than two outs when the ninth hitter is up, he almost always bunts. However, a notable alternative exists to this, in which the pitcher or weakest hitter actually bats in the 8th slot, and another player with decent OBP and speed bats in the 9th slot, thus creating a kind of second leadoff hitter, at the bottom of the lineup, that loops to the top of the order afterwards. This has been used sparingly in the major leagues, but was notably employed by St. Louis Cardinals manager Tony La Russa in the second half of the 1998 baseball season, and again in August 2007 and in 2008, and by Milwaukee Brewers manager Ned Yost in 2008. Chicago Cubs manager Joe Maddon placed the pitcher in the #8 spot during the beginning of the 2017 Cubs season.

== Bragan's brainstorm ==
On August 18, 1956, major league manager Bobby Bragan placed his best hitter in the leadoff position and the remainder of his lineup in descending batting average order. In his 1966 book, Percentage Baseball, Earnshaw Cook claimed that Bragan's lineup would result in 1 to 2 more wins per season. A computer simulation demonstrated the superiority of Bragan's lineup.
