= Designated hitter =

Offensive position in baseball and softball

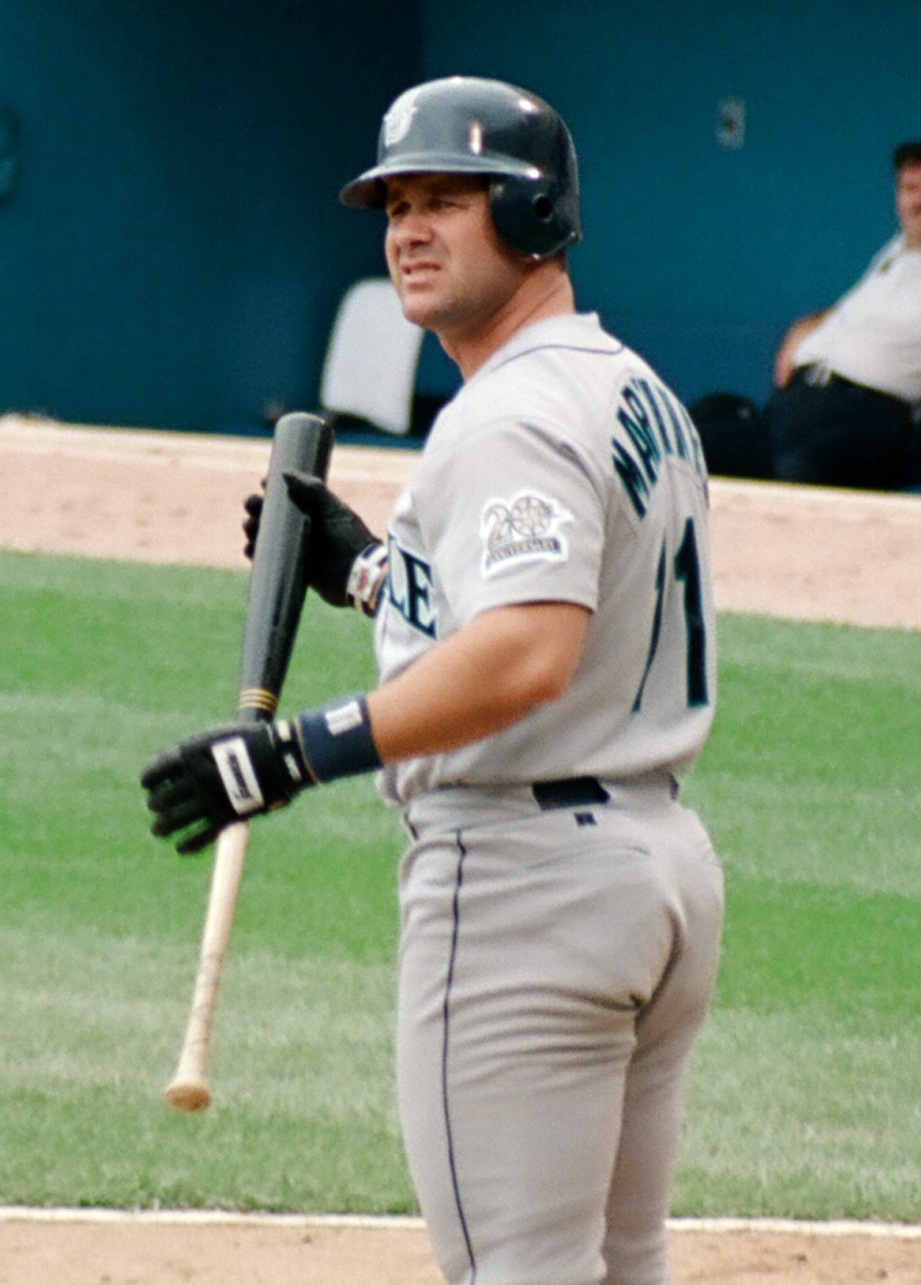
Edgar Martínez, who spent most of his career as the full-time designated hitter for the Seattle Mariners, was inducted into the Hall of Fame in 2019.

The designated hitter (DH) is a baseball player who bats in place of the pitcher. Unlike other players in a team's lineup, they generally only play as an offensive player and usually do not play defense as a fielder or a pitcher during a game. Due to their specialized offensive-only role, the designated hitter is generally expected to produce above average offensive stats and production compared to other players who play defense.

In Major League Baseball, the position is authorized by Rule 5.11 of the Official Baseball Rules. It was adopted by the American League in 1973 and by the National League in 2022, making it universal in MLB. Within that time frame, nearly all amateur, collegiate, and professional leagues worldwide adopted the designated hitter or some variant, a major exception being Nippon Professional Baseball's Central League, which plans to adopt it in 2027.

== Major League Baseball rule ==
The designated hitter is a player who does not play a position in the field, but instead replaces the pitcher in the batting order. However, a starting pitcher (but not relievers) may choose to also start as the designated hitter so that the pitcher bats for himself. The DH may only be used for the pitcher (and not any other position player) as stated in Rule 5.11. Use of the DH is optional, but must be determined before the start of the game. If a team does not begin a game with a DH, the team's pitchers (or pinch hitters) must bat for the entire game.

The designated hitter can be moved to a fielding position during the game. If the DH is moved to another position, his team forfeits the role of designated hitter, and the pitcher or another player (the latter possible only in case of a multiple substitution) would bat in the spot of the position player replaced by the former DH. If the designated hitter is moved to pitcher, any subsequent pitcher (or pinch-hitter thereof) would bat should that spot in the batting order come up again (except for a further multiple substitution). Likewise, if a pinch-hitter bats for a non-pitcher, and then remains in the game as the pitcher, the team would forfeit the use of the DH for the remainder of the game, and the player who was DH would become a position player (or exit the game).

The DH substitution rule has an exception: If a starting pitcher started simultaneously as the designated hitter, that player may remain as DH to bat for his relievers after being replaced as pitcher, likewise remaining as starting pitcher if he was pinch hit or pinch run for by a bench player who had become the new designated hitter. If that player starts the game as a designated hitter and pitches out of the bullpen, the team would lose the designated hitter once his relief appearance is over, unless he is moved to another position on the field. The exception was added by MLB for the 2022 season, coincident with the introduction of the universal DH. It has been widely nicknamed the "Ohtani rule" as a nod to Shohei Ohtani, at the time a two-way star pitcher and hitter for the Los Angeles Angels who had sometimes batted for himself in the past, but had to leave games as hitter or move to another position on the field when relieved as pitcher due to the limitations of the old rule. The rule change was subsequently applied for international-level games, starting with the 2023 World Baseball Classic.

Unlike other positions, the DH is "locked" into the batting order. No multiple substitution may be made to alter the batting rotation of the DH. In other words, a double switch involving the DH and a position player (with the exception of players started as starting pitcher and designated hitter) is not legal. For example, if the DH is batting fourth and the catcher is batting eighth, the manager cannot replace both players so as to have the new catcher bat fourth and the new DH bat eighth. Once a team loses its DH under any of the scenarios already discussed, the double switch becomes fully available, and may well be used via necessity, should the former DH be replaced in the lineup.

Summary of designated hitter use in MLB by season and league/event
Season(s)	National League	American League	World Series	All-Star Game	Interleague play
Before 1973	No	No	No	No	No Interleague play until 1997 MLB season.
1973–1975	No	Yes	No	No	No Interleague play until 1997 MLB season.
1976–1985	No	Yes	Yes in even years, No in odd years	No	No Interleague play until 1997 MLB season.
1986–1988	No	Yes	Home team rule	No	No Interleague play until 1997 MLB season.
1989–1996	No	Yes	Home team rule	Home team rule	No Interleague play until 1997 MLB season.
1997–2009	No	Yes	Home team rule	Home team rule	Home team rule
2010–2019, 2021	No	Yes	Home team rule	Yes	Home team rule
2020, 2022–present	Yes	Yes	Yes	Yes	Yes

=== Interleague play and exhibitions (until 2021) ===
In Major League Baseball, during interleague play between 1997 and 2021, the DH rule was applied to a game based on the rules of the home team's league. If the game was played in an American League park, the designated hitter could be used; in a National League park, the pitcher must bat or else be replaced with a pinch-hitter. On June 12, 1997, San Francisco Giants outfielder Glenallen Hill became the first National League DH in a regular-season game, when the Giants met the American League Texas Rangers at The Ballpark in Arlington in interleague play.

At first, the DH rule was not applied to the World Series. From 1973 to 1975, all World Series games were played under National League rules, with no DH and with pitchers required to bat. For 1976, it was decided the DH rule would apply to all games in the World Series, regardless of venue, but only in even-numbered years. Cincinnati Reds first baseman Dan Driessen became the first National League designated hitter in the postseason; he was the DH in all four World Series games that year. This practice lasted through 1985. Beginning in the 1986 World Series, the DH rule was used in games played in the stadium of the American League representative.

There was initially no DH in the All-Star Game. Beginning in 1989, the rule was applied only to games played in American League stadiums. During this era, if the All-Star Game was scheduled for an American League stadium, fans would vote for the DH for the American League's starting lineup, while the National League's manager decided that league's starting DH. Since 2010, the designated hitter has been used by both teams, regardless of where the game is played. This was because in the non-DH games, pitchers would rarely actually bat and would usually be replaced by pinch hitters. Since the National League now uses the DH, it is included in the All-Star voting similar to how it had already been included in American League voting.

For the 2021 All-Star Game, MLB granted an exception to the DH rule because Los Angeles Angels' Shohei Ohtani was selected as both starting DH and starting pitcher. Ohtani started the game as both a pitcher and the DH and was replaced as pitcher after one inning but remained in the game as the DH without the American League having to forfeit the use of a DH. The American League would have lost the DH if either Ohtani, or a player replacing him at DH, had played a position in the field other than pitcher.

== Background and history ==
Every patron of the game is conversant with the utter worthlessness of the average pitcher when he goes up to try and hit the ball.

— The Sporting Life, December 19, 1891

The rationale for the designated hitter rule arose early in the history of professional baseball. During the 1880s, an increased emphasis on improving the specialized skill of pitching contributed to a decline in pitcher batting averages. In 1891, during negotiations surrounding the merger of the American Association and National League, team executives J. Walter Spalding of New York and William Chase Temple of Pittsburgh proposed competing ideas to eliminate the pitcher from the batting order. Temple's proposal "favored the substitution of another man to take the pitcher's place at the bat when it came his turn to go there," while Spalding proposed removing the pitcher's turn from the batting order, reducing its length to eight players. Temple's proposal was voted down by a narrow margin prior to the 1892 season.

The idea of a designated hitter was raised by Philadelphia Athletics manager Connie Mack in 1906; however, his proposal received little support.

Pitchers rejected the idea of giving up hitting. In 1910, Addie Joss stated, "if there is one thing that a pitcher would rather do than make the opposing batsmen look foolish, it is to step to the plate, especially in a pinch, and deliver the much-needed hit." A 1918 article in Baseball Magazine attributed to Babe Ruth stated, "the pitcher who can't get in there in the pinch and win his own game with a healthy wallop, isn't more than half earning his salary in my way of thinking." Nevertheless, in the late 1920s, National League president John Heydler made several attempts to introduce a 10th-man designated hitter as a way to add more offense to the game. Several managers were interested in the idea and intended to implement it during spring training in 1929. However, Heydler's proposal was not adopted as an official rule change, and he advised teams to have pitchers bat during spring training in order for them to prepare for the regular season.

Serious momentum to implement the designated hitter was absent until the pitching dominance of the late 1960s. In 1968, Bob Gibson led the major leagues with a live-ball era record 1.12 ERA. For the first time since 1908, the American and National Leagues had a collective batting average below .240; Carl Yastrzemski led the American League in hitting with only a .301 mark. After the season, in order to increase offensive output, the height of the pitcher's mound was reduced from 15 to 10 inches (38 to 25 cm), and the upper limit of the strike zone was lowered from the top of a batter's shoulders to his armpits. In 1969, the International League and four other minor leagues began a four-year trial period for the designated hitter. The American League allowed its use in spring training in 1971, however, when the minor league trial period ended, the American and National Leagues could not agree on implementation.

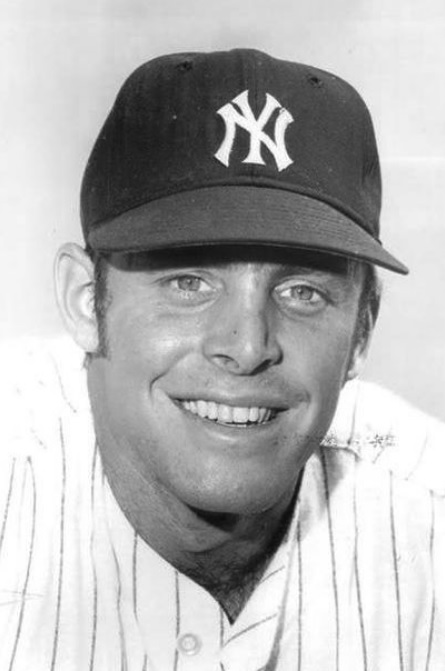
New York Yankee Ron Blomberg was the first designated hitter during a regular season game.

Like other experimental baseball rule changes of the 1960s and 1970s, the DH was embraced by Oakland Athletics owner Charlie O. Finley. On January 11, 1973, Finley and the other American League owners voted 8–4 to approve the designated hitter for a three-year trial run. The National League chose not to implement the DH; it was intended for the two leagues to agree on a common rule at the end of the American League's trial. On April 6, 1973, Ron Blomberg of the New York Yankees became the first designated hitter in MLB history, facing Boston Red Sox right-hander Luis Tiant in his first plate appearance. Blomberg was walked on five pitches with the bases loaded in the first inning. As expected, the American League posted a higher batting average than the National League in 1973. This trend held in every season in which the American League employed the designated hitter but the National League did not between 1973 and 2021.

At the end of its three-year trial period, the American League kept the designated hitter, while the National League still refused to adopt it. In response to increases in American League attendance because of the DH, the National League held a vote on August 13, 1980, to determine whether or not to adopt it. A majority of the 12 member teams was necessary to pass the rule, and the measure was expected to pass. However, when the teams were informed that the rule would not take effect until the 1982 season, Philadelphia Phillies vice president Bill Giles was unsure of how the team owner, Ruly Carpenter, wanted him to vote. Unable to contact Carpenter, who was on a fishing trip, Giles was forced to abstain from voting. Prior to the meeting, Harding Peterson, general manager for the Pittsburgh Pirates, was told to side with the Phillies however they voted. The final tally was four teams voting for the DH (the Atlanta Braves, New York Mets, St. Louis Cardinals, and San Diego Padres), five votes against (the Chicago Cubs, Cincinnati Reds, Los Angeles Dodgers, Montreal Expos, and San Francisco Giants), and three abstentions (the Phillies, Pirates, and Houston Astros). Five days after that meeting, the Cardinals fired their general manager, John Claiborne, who was the leading proponent for the adoption of the DH rule, and the National League never held another vote on the issue.

The designated hitter was not used in the World Series from 1973 to 1975. Between 1976 and 1985, the DH was used in the World Series during even-numbered years, while pitchers batted in odd-numbered years. In 1986, the rule was changed to implement designated hitters only in World Series games in which the home team was from the American League. This rule was also adopted for interleague play during the regular season upon its introduction in 1997.

As time passed, the designated hitter rule enabled American League managers to employ diverse strategies in setting their teams' lineups. Managers could rotate the DH role among part-time players (for example, using a left-handed batter against a right-handed pitcher and vice versa), or they could employ a full-time designated hitter against all pitchers. Healthy regular lineup players gained the ability to take a partial day off by not playing the field, while aging, injured, and injury prone players gained the opportunity to bat without being exposed to re-injury while fielding. By 2009, only a handful of players compiled over 400 at-bats as a DH each year. This trend continued, even with the eventual onset of the universal designated hitter.

The Astros moved to the American League in 2013, giving each league 15 teams and requiring interleague play throughout the entire season. There was debate within MLB to unify the rules of the two leagues, with either the American League returning to its pre-1973 rules and having the pitcher hit or the National League adopting the DH. In January 2016, MLB commissioner Rob Manfred indicated that consideration was given to the National League adopting the DH for the 2017 season, when a new collective bargaining agreement would take effect. However, he later backtracked, saying that he did not envision such a change being made in the near future. Accordingly, the DH rule was not then adopted by the National League.

In 2020, in an attempt to avoid overtaxing pitchers and lessen the impact of the COVID-19 pandemic, the National League used the DH for the first time. For the first time since 1972 (the final year before the American League adopted the DH), the National League had the higher seasonal batting average of the two leagues. At least one of the proposals released during negotiations between MLB and the Major League Baseball Players' Association (MLBPA) regarding the 2021 season's rules included the so-called "universal DH," but an impasse led to a temporary return to National League pitchers hitting in that year.

On April 4, 2021, an American League team voluntarily declined to use a designated hitter in their starting lineup for the first time since 1976, when the Los Angeles Angels placed starting pitcher Shohei Ohtani second in the batting order. This was also the first time since 1903 that a pitcher had been listed as the second hitter in the starting lineup. On June 23, 2021, Ohtani made history again when, for the first time, an AL team did not use the designated hitter and an NL team did. While the Angels declined the DH privilege, the visiting Giants opted to use it, starting Alex Dickerson at DH.

On February 10, 2022, Manfred announced plans for a universal DH beginning with the 2022 season. The rule was ratified as part of a new collective bargaining agreement with the MLBPA on March 10, 2022, after which both leagues have continuously employed the designated hitter.

== Debate ==
The designated hitter rule has been the subject of debate both before and after its implementation. Supporters of the rule have cited its original intent, to replace weak-hitting pitchers in the batting order, and the potential for added excitement due to the associated increase in offense. Critics have cited the asymmetry of creating a position that is not required to hit and field. Writing for The Week in 2015, Michael Brendan Dougherty argued that the designated hitter disrupts the tradition of the game, saying "it isn't what my generation and several previous ones knew as baseball." During the DH era, attendance in the National League was higher than in the American League, despite the designated hitter increasing run production in the American League by an average of .29 runs per game.

Older players who are weak fielders or have a history of injuries have been able to extend their careers by becoming designated hitters, as the position is less physically demanding than those that involve playing the field. In 1997, at a time when the DH was only used in the American League, Tony Gwynn, then 37, said that "for a guy in my position, at my age, if they do put it in the National League, boy, would that be huge." However, opponents of the designated hitter have argued that it has allowed subpar and aging players to take up space on rosters longer than would otherwise be acceptable.

The designated hitter rule also changes managerial strategy, particularly in late innings. Without the DH, a manager must decide whether to let a pitcher bat or to substitute a pinch hitter. If a pinch hitter is used, then the manager must decide whether that hitter will stay in the game after batting, and if so, at what position. When the decision to remove a pitcher is made, the manager may also use the double switch, a substitution mechanism in which the new pitcher adopts a different position in the batting order than the previous pitcher. The double switch is typically employed to delay the new pitcher's first plate appearance. The designated hitter reduces the need for late-inning pinch hitters and eliminates the principal utility of the double switch entirely.

Prior to the introduction of the universal DH, interleague play caused teams to adjust their usual strategies for lineup and roster construction. In 1993, John Olerud, who had won that year's American League batting title, was benched in the third game of the World Series, played in a National League stadium, when designated hitter Paul Molitor took Olerud's typical position at first base. In 2003, ESPN writer Jayson Stark claimed that the San Francisco Giants may have lost the previous year's World Series because their roster was not optimized for the use of a DH in the home stadium of their American League opponents. Similarly, after the Central League champion Yomiuri Giants were swept in the 2019 Japan Series, manager Tatsunori Hara said that the addition of the designated hitter gave teams in the Pacific League an advantage when developing pitchers.

When regular season interleague play was introduced to Major League Baseball, multiple proposals were made to remove the DH from the American League in order to maintain consistency across both leagues. Until the introduction of the universal DH, the American League held a distinct advantage over the National League during interleague play in most seasons. The ability of American League teams to increase the depth of their lineups with designated hitters contributed to this trend. When the games were played in AL parks, the NL team had to put a bench player into the lineup. When the games were played in NL parks, because the AL team had to take a player out of their lineup, they had a starting player available to pinch-hit and/or come in as a substitute player later in the game, as opposed to a bench player on the NL team.

Occasionally, injuries sustained by pitchers were cited to support the expansion of the DH to the National League. In 2008, New York Yankees pitcher Chien-Ming Wang was injured while running the bases in an interleague game against the Houston Astros. Wang was diagnosed with a torn Lisfranc ligament and a partial tear of the peroneus longus of the right foot. Wang's subsequent extensive rehabilitation prevented him from being an effective major league pitcher after the injury. Yankees part owner Hank Steinbrenner expressed frustration with pitchers having to bat in National League parks, saying, "I just think it's time the NL joined the 21st century." In 2015, Max Scherzer, who had switched from the American League to the National League during the previous offseason, sustained an injury while batting. He subsequently said that while he enjoyed hitting, he favored consistency between the leagues, remarking, "Who would people rather see, a real hitter hitting home runs or a pitcher swinging a wet newspaper? Both leagues need to be on the same set of rules."

== Awards ==
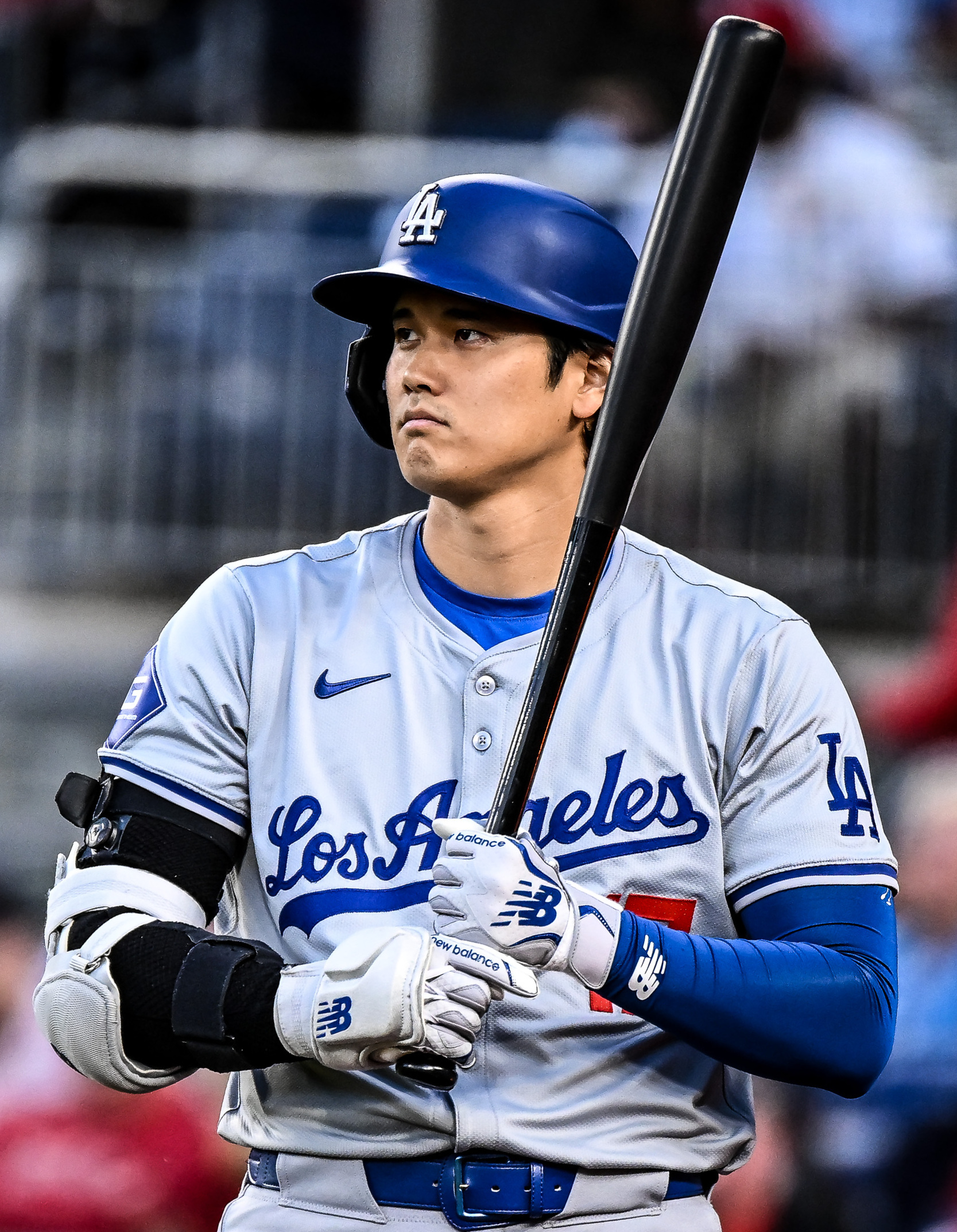
Shohei Ohtani won four Most Valuable Player awards while playing the majority of his games at designated hitter. In 2024, Ohtani became the first MVP winner to play exclusively at DH.

The Baseball Writers' Association of America presents an annual award to the outstanding designated hitter of the season, called the Edgar Martínez Award. Renamed for the former Seattle Mariners DH after his retirement in 2004, the award was introduced in 1973 and has been given every season since, except 1994 due to the players' strike. Multiple winners include David Ortiz (eight times), Martínez (five times), and Shohei Ohtani (four times).

DHs have generally not had much impact on the Major League Baseball Most Valuable Player Award or National Baseball Hall of Fame voting, because of the relative rarity of the full-time DH and the DH not contributing defense.

In 2021, Shohei Ohtani became the first everyday DH to win league MVP honors, having played in 126 of 155 games (81.29%) at DH. However, Ohtani's MVP season was mainly due to his success as a two-way player, having also logged 23 games as a pitcher and seven games in the outfield. In 2023, Ohtani won his second MVP award, playing 134 of 135 games as a DH that season while also pitching in 23 of those games. In 2024, Ohtani, now with the Los Angeles Dodgers in the National League, won his second consecutive MVP award, the first time the award was given to a player who exclusively played as a DH. Due to Tommy John surgery on his pitching elbow, Ohtani only played as a DH in 2024. Ohtani won his third consecutive MVP award in 2025, returning to two-way form with 47 innings in 14 starts as a pitcher in addition to 158 appearances as a DH.

During the 1993 season Paul Molitor became the first player to win the World Series Most Valuable Player Award, while playing 137 of 160 games (85.63%) as a DH. Hideki Matsui (2009), David Ortiz (2013), and Jorge Soler (2021) were the only other DHs to win World Series MVP. Soler, playing for the Atlanta Braves, was the only DH to win the award while a member of a National League team. In games played at National League parks, Ortiz and Molitor played at first base, while Soler played in right field. However, Matsui became the only World Series MVP to never play in the field that season, as he came in as a pinch hitter in the pitcher's spot but was never moved to a fielding position via a double switch during games played in a National League park. Ortiz was also the first designated hitter to win the ALCS MVP in 2004, followed by Delmon Young in 2012, and Yordan Alvarez in 2021. In 2025, Shohei Ohtani became the first designated hitter to win NLCS MVP, though he also appeared in six innings as a pitcher.

Among Hall of Famers, Paul Molitor and Jim Rice were, until 2014, the only inductees to even have played at least 25% of their games at DH, though Molitor played more games at DH than any other position during his career. In 2014, Frank Thomas became the first Hall of Famer who played the majority of his games at DH. In 2019, Edgar Martínez and Harold Baines were inducted into the Hall of Fame. Martinez played over 70% of his games at DH. Baines played more than half of his games at DH, playing only 63 games in the field between 1989 and the end of his career in 2001. In 2022, David Ortiz became the first full-time DH to be elected to the Hall of Fame on his first ballot. Ortiz played 2,028 of his 2,306 career games (88%) at DH.

Prior to 2020, only one designated hitter Silver Slugger Award was awarded, and only American League players were the recipients due to the National League awarding a pitcher Silver Slugger Award. In 2020, and since 2022, both American and National Leagues began awarding Silver Slugger Awards for designated hitters. The first National League DH Silver Slugger Award was given to Marcell Ozuna in 2020. In 2018, J. D. Martinez became the first and to date only player to win two Silver Slugger Awards in the same season, winning as both a designated hitter and a left fielder.

== Outside of Major League Baseball ==
=== Nippon Professional Baseball ===
Japan's Pacific League adopted the designated hitter in 1975, two years after its adoption in the American League. Japan's Central League has not adopted the designated hitter – the only top-level professional league in the world to refrain from doing so. In August 2025, the six owners of Central League teams unanimously voted to adopt the DH beginning in 2027. When teams from different leagues play against each other in interleague games or the Japan Series, the DH rule is currently adopted if the Pacific League's team hosts the game, similar to the MLB rules before the universal DH.

=== Mexican League ===
The Mexican League introduced the designated hitter in 1974, one year after the American League.

=== Winter league baseball ===
The Cuban National Series adopted the designated hitter in 1977.

=== KBO League ===
The KBO League introduced the designated hitter in 1982.

=== Minor League Baseball ===
The DH is used for all Minor League Baseball (MiLB) games. Prior to the adoption of the DH by the National League in 2022, only Rookie and Single-A level leagues used the DH rule in all games, while Double-A and Triple-A games, when both teams were National League affiliates the designated hitter was not used. The reason for the difference was that as players get closer to reaching the majors, teams preferred to have the rules mimic those of the major league teams for which the players may soon be playing.

The Atlantic League, an independent minor league that became an MLB Partner League after the 2021 MiLB reorganization, implemented an experimental "double-hook rule" for its 2021 season. Under this rule, once a team removes its starting pitcher it loses the right to use a DH for the rest of the game. The "double hook" rule was modified for the 2022 Atlantic League season. The change allows a team whose starting pitcher goes at least five innings to keep its DH.

=== Amateur baseball ===
In American high schools and other amateur baseball leagues that use National Federation of State High School Associations (NFHS) rules, a DH may bat in place of one player in any position, not just a pitcher. Many coaches use a designated hitter in place of the weakest hitter in the lineup, if they use one at all. In amateur baseball, many pitchers are also good hitters and will often play another position (or even DH) when not pitching.

In 2020, NFHS rules were modified to also add a "Player/DH" rule where a player may start the game with offensive and defensive roles, and be substituted out only on defense while remaining in the game on offense as a DH.

Japanese high school baseball was, for a long time, one of the few amateur baseball leagues in the world to never use the designated hitter rule at all. It was not until the 2026 rulebook update that the designated hitter rule was introduced, with the 2026 Spring Koshien tournament being the first major tournament to adopt the rule. In high school baseball in South Korea, the rule has been adopted since 2004. American Legion rules, on the other hand, allow the DH only to bat for the pitcher; prior to 1995, the use of the DH was not allowed in Legion baseball at all.

In college baseball, NCAA rules state that the designated hitter must hit for the pitcher, but in many instances the pitcher is also a good hitter, and the coach may elect to let the pitcher bat in the lineup. If the pitcher opts to bat for himself, he is treated as two separate positions – a pitcher and a designated hitter (abbreviated P/DH on the lineup card) – and may be substituted for as such (i.e. if he is removed as the pitcher, he may remain as the designated hitter and vice versa). However, if a player who starts a game as a P/DH is relieved as the starting pitcher, he may not return to the mound even if he remains in the game as the DH, and he may not play any other defensive position after being relieved as the pitcher unless he immediately moves to another defensive position, in which case the new pitcher must assume the spot in the batting order of the fielder the P/DH substituted for, and the DH is lost for the remainder of the game. Conversely, a player who begins the game as the DH, but not as the pitcher, may come into the game as a reliever and remain as the DH (in effect becoming a P/DH), be relieved on the mound later in the game but continue to bat as the DH.

In Little League Baseball, the DH is not used except in the Senior League (age 15–16) division, where the DH can bat in place of any defensive player. However, a league may adopt a rule which requires all players present and able to play to be listed in the batting order (such that the order contains more than nine players), and thus all players will have a turn to bat even when they are not assigned a fielding position. Players in the batting lineup without a position on the field are given the position designation extra hitter (EH), a position seen occasionally in other amateur organizations (both youth and adult) - and integrated as the "10th man" of Savannah Bananas exhibition ballgames since 2020 as part of the lineup alongside the DH.

== Sources ==
- Will, George F. (1990). Men at Work: The Craft of Baseball. Harper Collins. ISBN 9780060973728.
- McKelvey, G. Richard (2004). All Bat, No Glove: A History of the Designated Hitter. McFarland. ISBN 978-0786419449.
- Dickey, Glenn (1980). The History of American League Baseball. Stein and Day. ISBN 9780812827002.
- Johnson, Lloyd (2002) [1999]. Baseball's Book of Firsts (Revised ed.). Running Press. ISBN 9780762414871.
- Mahony, Phillip (2014). Baseball Explained. ISBN 978-0786479641. Archived from the original on August 13, 2014.
