= BBCOR =

Baseball bat performance standard

BBCOR (Bat-ball coefficient of restitution) is a baseball bat performance standard created by the National Collegiate Athletic Association (NCAA) to certify the performance of composite baseball bats used in competition.

From the standard:

To initiate the certification process for all baseball bats that are constructed with materials other than one-piece solid wood, an interested bat manufacturer must send one of the NCAA Certification Centers written notice of its intent to request certification testing on specific models it deems appropriate for testing.

This standard went into effect on January 1, 1990 and all composite bats used in NCAA competition must meet the BBCOR standard in terms of their coefficient of restitution. The standard is used to certify "all baseball bats that are constructed with materials other than one-piece solid wood".
