= Double switch (baseball) =

Type of player substitution involving batting order change

In baseball, the double switch is a type of player substitution, usually performed by a team while playing defense. The double switch is typically used to make a pitching substitution, while simultaneously placing the incoming pitcher in a more favorable spot in the batting order than was occupied by the outgoing pitcher. (On the assumption that the pitcher will be a poor hitter, the incoming pitcher will generally take the spot in the batting order of a position player who has recently batted, to reduce the chance that the pitcher will make a plate appearance in the next few innings.) To perform a double switch (or any other substitution), the ball must be dead.

With the National League having utilized the designated hitter since 2022, pitchers no longer take a spot in the batting order, rendering the double switch virtually unneeded.

== Procedure ==
Since the batting order can be changed only as a result of a player substitution, (Note: No player currently in the game may legally bat in place of another player in the game (except as a result of the designated hitter rule). However, it is possible to successfully bat out of order, if the opposing team does not appeal the violation.) while the defensive arrangement may be changed freely (among players currently in the game), the double switch typically takes the following form:

1. Player A (outgoing pitcher, batting soon) is replaced by Player B (a position player), taking Player A's place in the batting order.
2. Player C (outgoing position player, batting later than Player A) is replaced by Player D (a pitcher), taking Player C's place in the batting order.
3. Player D is pitching in place of Player A, and Player B is fielding in place of Player C. (Note: According to Major League rules, when more than one defensive substitution is made at the same time, the manager must specify any changes to the batting order, or the umpire-in-chief will determine the order by applying Rule 3.03, which states that "[a] substitute player shall bat in the replaced player’s position in the team’s batting order.")

In the short term, the lineup is strengthened because a poor-hitting pitcher will not make a plate appearance soon. The disadvantage is that a position player must be removed from play and replaced by another, often inferior, position player. The advantage of the double switch over pinch hitting is that it uses up fewer players. If a relief pitcher is brought in before the at-bat, then the manager can substitute a pinch-hitter for him. However, this would require a new pitcher for the next half-inning. By using a double switch, an incoming pitcher can be left in the game for a substantial period before his turn in the batting lineup arrives, no matter what the previous batting order was.

While the double switch played an important role in the National League, the designated hitter (DH) rule has effectively eliminated the advantages of the double switch. The designated hitter's role is to bat in the pitcher's spot in the lineup. Major League rules do not allow a multiple substitution involving a DH to alter the lineup position of the DH. Although uncommon, it is possible to forgo the DH privilege (e.g. if the DH becomes a position player, usually due to injury to another player), and then utilize the double switch later with that player. It can also be used by an AL team playing on the road during interleague play or the World Series, because MLB rules call for the rules of the home team to be used when teams from different leagues meet (so there is no DH when the NL team is the home team). As of the 2022 CBA, MLB has implemented a universal designated hitter, eliminating the need for the double-switch.

When the team is up to bat, a manager can get the same effect as a double switch by leaving in the player who has pinch-hit for the pitcher and replacing another player in the lineup who has made the last out of the inning with a new pitcher. This will take the following form:

1. Player A (outgoing pitcher, batting next) is replaced by Player B (a position player) as a pinch-hitter, taking Player A's place in the batting order.
2. Player C makes the last out of the inning is replaced by Player D (a pitcher), taking Player C's place in the batting order.
3. Player D is pitching in place of Player A, and Player B is fielding in place of Player C.

A double switch has infrequently resulted in a team batting out of turn because the lineup card was not updated to reflect the change, either because the umpires were not informed of the change, or because the change was not recorded. In addition, because double-switches are typically communicated verbally, it creates opportunities for confusion and miscommunication that can be costly to the switching team.
