= Composite baseball bat =

Type of baseball bat

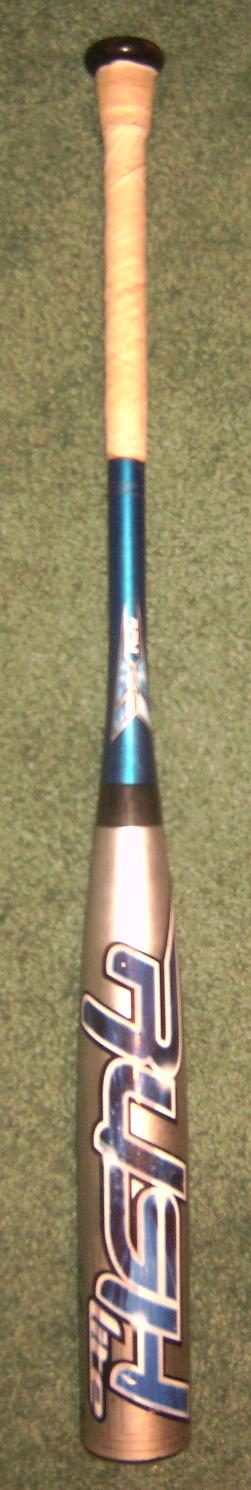
Rawlings Rush composite baseball bat

Composite baseball bats, as opposed to aluminum or wood baseball bats, incorporate a reinforced carbon fiber polymer, or composite, into the bat's construction. This composite material can make up all or part of the bat. Bats made entirely of this polymer are referred to as composite bats. Bats which only incorporate a portion of polymer (and the rest either wood or an aluminum alloy) are referred to as composite hybrids.

Composite bats can also be constructed to improve their trampoline effect over time. That advantage, namely the improved trampoline effect over a break in period, put the use of composite bats under further NCAA scrutiny during the 2009 NCAA Division I baseball tournament. Composite bats, tested after they were already broke in, showed performance standards well beyond the accepted ball exit speed ratio (BESR) Test.

As a result, a new standard, known as the batted-ball coefficient of restitution (BBCOR), was put in place in 2011 which required an accelerated break in period and testing to measure the trampoline effect of composite bats. Since the new restrictions on composite baseball bats NCAA hitting production has been noticeably dampened.

== History ==
Composite bats have been around as early as the 1980s for use in slow-pitch softball. Most notably, Louisville Slugger developed a slow-pitch bat that was awarded best performance at the 2001 Bat Wars. Miken responded in 2002 by developing their own composite softball bat. Even though composite material had only been historically used in slow-pitch and softball, this technology had emerged in little league, high school, and collegiate baseball as early as 2000. Baum Bat invented the 1st composite wood bat in 1991 with partnership with Major League Baseball.

== Design ==
The design of a composite bat depends on which league it is suitable for play. Composite bats are used in a number of different leagues. Most Little League programs have governing rules concerning composite bats. High school (NFHS) and Collegiate play are governed under the BBCOR standards. Metal or composite bats are not allowed in the MLB or its affiliates. MLB or affiliates for short season and rookie ball does allow a select few composite wood bats. An example of MLB approved composite wood bat would be the Baum Bat.

To be suitable for play in BBCOR leagues (NCAA, NFHS, etc.), for example, composite bats must meet certain requirements. Many of these requirements are the same as their aluminum or wood counterparts. For example, the bat's weight to length ratio, known as the drop (weight in ounces - length in inches), must equal negative three. Meaning, a bat with a 33-inch length must weigh 30 ounces. Further, no bat's barrel diameter, at any point, can be greater than 2 5/8 inches. For composite bats there is added scrutiny. Specifically, the rebound rate or trampoline effect, after an accelerated break in period, must stay under certain requirements.

Little League International has a different standard for composite bat allowance in its leagues. Composite bats must meet an accelerated break standard set by the USA Baseball organization and be stamped with an official USA Baseball logo. Other bat dimensions are akin to wood and aluminum alloy requirements (length, barrel diameter, etc.).

== Disadvantages ==
When it comes to a bat's performance there are very few disadvantages in the use of a composite bat. The most notable concern is the use in cold temperatures. The polymers used in composite bats can be susceptible to cracking if used in cold temperatures.

Player safety is another matter altogether. In December 2010, Little League Baseball announced a moratorium on the use of composite bats due to concerns about safety of young players. The increased batted ball speed from bats designed with composite materials introduced increased risk to fielders and especially to the pitcher. For a few years, Little League independently tested composite bats and published a list of approved bats. Starting in 2018, Little League, along with most other youth baseball leagues, have switched to the USABat standard, which is like BBCOR for lighter weight bats, keeps the trampoline effect under what Little League Baseball considers a safe level. Some youth baseball leagues have not adopted the USABat standard, staying with the older USSSA BPF 1.15 standard which is more akin to the old high school BESR standard, and allow bats with considerably higher trampoline effects.

== Advantages ==
There are many advantages to using composite baseball bats. As has been chronicled in slow-pitch softball recently, composite bats have outperformed standard aluminum bats. There are five main advantages for using composite bats: swing weight, trampoline effect, bending stiffness, bending vibrations, and sound.

=== Swing weight ===
The swing weight of a baseball bat deals with how heavy the bat "feels" when swinging. The swing weight is measured around a certain pivot point along the bat. Once a pivot point is determined (usually 6 inches for baseball bats) the bats balance point, total weight and the amount of time it takes for the bat to swing from side to side like a pendulum are used to determine its 'swing weight', or as some refer to it, its mass moment of inertia.

Bat manufacturers can adjust a composite bat's swing weight by changing how the weight is distributed along the bat. Composite bats can control their swing weight (through weight distribution) more effectively than aluminum and wood since composite material is lighter and more easily manipulated.

=== Trampoline effect ===
The trampoline effect, which is common terminology for baseball players, is the phenomenon when the baseball "jumps" off the bat at contact. The bat-ball collision can be demonstrated from the physics of elastic collisions. The stiffer the barrel of the bat, the slower the baseball comes off the bat because it loses energy in the collision. The softer the barrel of the bat, the faster the baseball comes off the bat because it retains its energy applied by the pitcher. The trampoline effect has been experimentally tested, and results show that composite bats outperform all-aluminum bats. The reason why composite bats outperform other aluminum bats is that the trampoline effect can essentially be "tuned." Composite materials have properties that are different in all directions, or anisotropy, which allows the bat manufacturer to design the bat stiff longitudinally (along the handle) and softer circumferentially (around the barrel). This softer barrel allows the ball to come off with less energy loss while maintaining the stiffness of the bat in the handle.

=== Vibration ===
Ball players often experience a "sting" in their hands caused by vibrations when the ball does not come in contact with the sweet spot of the bat. The frequency of these vibrations throughout the bat is related to the bending stiffness. Daniel A. Russell of Kettering University has shown that standard aluminum bats have a high bending stiffness that produces vibrational frequencies in the range where most hands are sensitive; therefore, causing more sting. He also has shown that composite materials can lower this bending stiffness without compromising other advantages.

Including the lower bending stiffness, composite baseball bats have a higher damping rate. The damping rate corresponds to how quickly the material lessens the vibrations it is experiencing. Russell also states that composite bats have a damping rate anywhere from 2 to 10 times more than standard aluminum bat. Many ball players therefore refer to composite bats as more forgiving because if they do not make contact with the ball on the sweet spot, they will not feel the vibrations (sting) from the missed hit.

== Future outlook ==
For a time, the future of composite baseball bats at the collegiate level was in question. On July 22, 2009, the NCAA reported that the rules committee had requested to ban the use of composite bats. The NCAA Playing Rules Oversight Panel found that 20 out of the 25 composite bats tested during the 2009 NCAA Division 1 Baseball Tournament failed the BESR (Ball Exit Speed Ratio) test. The tests showed that the balls were actually coming off the bat much quicker than what the specifications allowed. Since bats must pass the BESR specification at the factory before reaching the market, there are two possible hypotheses. One suggests that the performance of composite bats increases with repeated use; the other states that players are intentionally altering the composite bat. The most common method of altering composite bats is through bat rolling, where a large amount of pressure is applied, by various means, while rolling the bat back and forth. The rules committee met on August 17, 2009, to discuss their proposal with manufacturers, and on August 24, the NCAA Playing Rules Oversight Panel approved a temporary ban on composite bats. During this temporary ban, the rules committee will continue testing the bats to determine if the performance is enhanced through repetitive use, or if intentional alteration seems more plausible. Currently, the NCAA is requiring that all composite bats meet BBCOR standards. See the Design section above for details.

On December 30, 2010, Little League officials announced a moratorium on using the bats in all divisions and during the Little League World Series. Several manufacturers of composite bats have subsequently obtained Little League International approval for specific composite bats.

On January 1, 2018, USA Baseball adopted a new bat standard. For Little League, Pony, Cal Ripken, Babe Ruth, Dixie, and AABC, new 2018 bats must be approved and showing a 2018 USA Bat Stamp. 2 5/8 barrel diameter is now available for play but parents should expect their kids' youth bats to perform at "wood-like levels", and is similar to BBCOR for lighter weight bats. USA Baseball has repeatedly stated that the USA Bat Standard is for the betterment of the sport because it will uphold the “long term integrity of the game” with injuries and financial profits not playing a role in the decision. Some leagues and tournament continue to allow the older USSSA 1.15 BPF bats which have considerably higher trampoline effect and are more similar to the old OWEN bats no longer allowed in high school and NCAA.
