= Batting out of turn =

Baseball concept

In baseball, batting out of turn or batting out of order refers to an event in which a batter makes a plate appearance out of sequence from the batting order specified in the lineup card submitted by the manager to the home plate umpire before the start of the game. The initial batting order is a list of the nine position players selected by the manager to play that game, indicating the sequence in which they will bat and the position to which they have been assigned for the game. During the game, batters make a plate appearance in the order specified by the batting order, repeating the sequence once the ninth batter has made a plate appearance.

Occasionally, one or more batters may bat in the incorrect order. In Major League Baseball, this violates rule 6.03(b) of the Official Baseball Rules. Batting out of turn is ignored by rule unless a member of the defensive team notifies the umpire that an infraction has occurred. Once the umpire is notified, the rule is enforced based on the official batting order. See Penalty section for the consequences of such notification.

== Determining the proper batter ==
At any time, the proper batter is simply the player whose name follows the previous actual batter in the written batting order (at the start of the game, the #1 hitter is the proper batter, and in subsequent innings, the leadoff proper batter is the one who follows the last batter to complete a plate appearance in the last previous inning). Any batter's out-of-turn but completed plate appearance is legalized when a pitch is thrown to any subsequent batter on either team. Thus, in order to determine who is the proper batter at any given time, it is necessary only to consider the last two batters who have received a pitch—the last proper or legalized batter and the batter whose action will be nullified if found improper.

When an improper batter is legalized by a pitch to a subsequent batter, the written order does not change. The proper batter is then the next batter in the written order just after the newly legalized improper batter, even if this causes one or more batters to be skipped.

== Penalty ==
If the umpire is notified of such an infraction immediately after a batter completes their appearance, then the umpire considers that batter and the previous one. If the batter who just finished batting does not follow the previous batter in the written order, their plate appearance was improper, any advances or scores due to their action are nullified, they are removed from the bases, and the proper batter is called out. If batting out of turn is appealed, the entire play is nullified under Official Baseball Rule 6.03(b) and MiLB Umpire Manual 4.3. Any runners who advanced on the play would be returned to the base they occupied at the time of the pitch. However, an advance on a stolen base or wild pitch is not a result of the batter's illegal action, and would stand. If the improper batter hits into a double play in which they are put out along with another runner, the defense can still appeal an improper batter. If this is the case, the proper batter is declared out, the other runner called out on the double play is returned to the base they occupied at the time of the pitch, and the batter that follows the proper batter who was declared out will come to the plate. Under high school (NFHS) rules, any additional outs recorded on the play stand - the other out on the play would not be nullified, and the defense could still benefit from the double play.

If the umpire is notified of such an infraction during a plate appearance (that is, a pitch has been thrown to the current batter, who has not yet been put out or become a runner), then the umpire considers the current batter and the previous one. If the current batter's name does not follow the previous actual batter's name in the written order, the current batter is improper. There is no penalty, but the situation is rectified — the proper batter comes to bat and assumes the improper batter's current count. In this situation, if the proper batter is on base, then they are skipped in the order, and the next batter in the order is now the proper batter.

== Example situations ==
Suppose the batting order is: Abel, Baker, Charles, Daniel, Edward, Frank, George, Hooker, Irwin.

=== Example: A proper batter fails to bat and is called out ===
Abel bats and is put out. Charles then bats out of turn. Charles makes a safe hit, reaching first base. Before any pitch is thrown to the next batter, a member of the defensive team asks the umpire to make a ruling. RULING: The proper batter after Abel was Baker, not Charles. Baker is called out for failing to bat in his turn, and Charles is removed from base and comes to bat again, because he is now the proper batter.

For instance, on July 6, 2013, San Francisco Giants manager Bruce Bochy submitted a lineup to the umpires with Gregor Blanco leading off, Marco Scutaro batting second, Pablo Sandoval batting third and Buster Posey hitting cleanup. After Blanco got on base and Scutaro made out, Posey improperly stepped to the plate and hit an RBI double to right field, scoring Blanco from third base. However, Los Angeles Dodgers manager Don Mattingly immediately appealed to plate umpire Tony Randazzo for a ruling and after discussion amongst the umpires, Sandoval was declared out for failing to bat in his turn, Blanco was sent back to 3rd base, and Posey, who was removed from the basepaths, came to bat again because he was now the proper batter. This time around, Posey flew out to end the inning, leaving Blanco stranded.

=== Example: An improper batter is legalized ===
Abel bats and is put out. Charles then bats out of turn. Charles makes a safe hit, reaching first base. Baker then comes to bat. A strike is pitched to Baker. A member of the defensive team then asks the umpire to make a ruling regarding the improper batting order. RULING: The first pitch to Baker made Charles's turn legal. The proper batter after Charles is Daniel, not Baker. Without penalty, Daniel comes to bat (replacing Baker) and assumes that one-strike count.

=== Example: An improper batter causes an out after a previous improper batter was legalized ===
Abel bats and is put out. Edward then bats out of turn. Edward reaches first base, and Charles then comes to bat and reaches base. The infraction is discovered by the defensive manager before a pitch is thrown to any subsequent batter, and it is reported to the umpire at that time. RULING: Edward did bat out of turn, but the first pitch to Charles legalized Edward's plate appearance. Therefore, the proper batter after Edward is Frank, so Charles is removed from the bases, Edward is returned to first base, Frank is called out for failing to bat in his proper turn, and George is now the proper batter.

=== Example: The proper batter is skipped due to being on base ===
Suppose that Charles often bats second but was written as the third batter for this game. Abel bats and is put out. Charles then bats out of turn and makes a safe hit, reaching first base. Baker then bats out of turn and receives a base on balls, advancing Charles to second base. Edward then comes to bat and takes a strike. The defense then appeals to the umpire. RULING: The first pitch to Edward legalized Baker's turn at bat. The proper batter after Baker is Charles, but he is on base, so he is skipped in the order; thus Daniel is now the proper batter. Because Edward's plate appearance had not yet finished, there is no penalty; Daniel comes to bat (replacing Edward) and assumes the one strike Edward received.

In this example, you will notice that the umpire ignores the fact that Charles previously batted out of turn. This underscores the principle that any pitch legalizes all previous turns at bat. Charles's turn at bat became legal when a pitch was thrown to Baker. The umpire needs to consider only Baker and Edward, the last two batters who have received a pitch.

=== Example: Substitutions and batting out of turn ===
When a substitute enters the game, he takes the written spot of the player whom he replaces. Suppose that George bats and is put out, then a pinch hitter, Stephen, comes to bat. Stephen (a) reports that he is batting for Irwin, or (b) doesn't report. Stephen hits safely and reaches first base. Hooker then comes to bat and hits safely, advancing Stephen. The defense appeals to the umpire that batter was out of turn.

RULING: In (a), Stephen's name replaces Irwin in the batting order. The first pitch to Hooker legalized Stephen's turn at bat. The proper batter after Stephen is Abel. Thus Hooker is removed from the bases for being an improper batter; Stephen returns to first base; Abel is called out for failing to bat in turn, and the proper batter is now Baker.

In (b), since Stephen did not report as a substitute, he legally enters the game in the place of the proper batter. Stephen's name thus replaces Hooker in the order, and Hooker is out of the game. Since Hooker was no longer in the game when he came to bat, he was an illegal substitute and not a batter out of turn. The penalty for this infraction is not related to batting out of turn; it is an illegal substitution.
