= Sport in India =

India has a history of sports dating back to the Vedic period, with Western sports having been imported during British rule. Cricket is the most popular sport in India, enjoyed across the country, but especially popular in the northern, western, and central regions. Football is the second most popular sport, with strong following in northeast, Jammu and Kashmir in the north and along the coastal belt in states like West Bengal, Odisha, Tamil Nadu, Kerala, Karnataka and Goa. Kabaddi is the third most popular, followed by field hockey and badminton. Cricket, football and kabaddi have a fanbase of 612 million, 305 million and 208 million people, respectively.

Cricket generates the highest television viewership, with the Indian Premier League being the most-followed sports league in the country. India's national cricket teams are among the most successful in the world. The men's team has won two Cricket World Cups, three T20 World Cups, and three Champions Trophies. The women's team has also won the Cricket World Cup, and have secured a runners-up position in the T20 World Cup.

Football enjoys some popularity, with the Indian Super League and Indian Women's League being the highest level of domestic football. (Note: West Bengal, Kerala, Goa, Tamilnadu, North eastern states have most fan following for football than any other state in India.) The men's team has won many gold medals at the Asian Games and South Asian Games. India has also reached the fourth place of the 1956 Olympics, qualified for the 1950 World Cup, finished as runners-up in 1964 Asian Cup, won the 2008 Challenge Cup and won the SAFF Championship multiple times. The women's team have been finalists in the 1980 and 1983 Asian Cup, secured third place in 1981, and won the SAFF Championship multiple times.

India has also had success in field hockey, with the men's team winning the World Cup in 1975. It is the nation's most successful sport at the Olympics, winning 13 medals, eight of which are gold. Other popular sports include kabaddi, badminton, tennis, athletics and kho-kho. Sports such as golf, rugby, wrestling, boxing, motorsport, and basketball are also enjoyed in the country.

India's diverse culture and people have influenced the wide variety of sports, with indigenous sports such as fighter kite and boat racing being popular in some regions. Other indigenous or India-originated sports include chess, kho-kho, polo, and snooker, with popularity varying by region. Water sports, like scuba diving, boating, surfing, and kiteboarding, frequently appear in coastal areas. Professional wrestling and mixed martial arts are popular among young audiences, with Indian wrestlers achieving international success. India has hosted the Men's and Women's Cricket World Cup many times. (Note: India national cricket team also have won the inaugural 2007 ICC World Twenty20 world cup once and hosted it once in 2016.) Although it is not considered a professional sport, cycling is a recreational activity and exercise in India.

Domestic professional commercial sports leagues in the country including Indian Premier League (Cricket), Women's Premier League (Cricket), Indian Super League (Football), Indian Football League (Football), Indian Women's League (Football), Pro Kabaddi (Kabaddi), Tennis Premier League (Tennis), Hockey India League (Hockey), Premier Badminton League (Badminton), Ultimate Table Tennis League (Table Tennis), Premier Handball League (Handball), Prime Volleyball League (Volleyball) and Ultimate Kho Kho (Kho–Kho). The major international sporting events that are annually organised in India include the Indian Open (Golf), India Open (Badminton), and India Open (Table Tennis). Since the launch of the Pro Kabaddi League, kabaddi has become one of India's fastest-growing sports. The sport has garnered substantial television viewership, contributing to its popularity and elevating its monetary value. Women's sports have also grown in India, with professional leagues including the Women's Premier League and Women's Kabaddi League.

India has hosted several international sporting events, including two editions of the Asian Games, three editions of the South Asian Games, the 2008 Commonwealth Youth Games, the 2010 Commonwealth Games, and seven men's and five women's cricket world championships. India has hosted four editions of the SAFF Championship, the SAFF Women's Championship in 2016, two editions of the AFC Women's Asian Cup in 1980 and 2022, and one junior FIFA World Cup world for each gender in football (2017 FIFA U-17 World Cup and 2022 FIFA U-17 Women's World Cup). India (Note: Sri Lanka will co-host the 2026 T20 world cup with India.) is set to host the 2030 Commonwealth Games and the 2031 Cricket World Cup. (Note: 2031 ICC world cup is scheduled to take place in India. Bangladesh will serve as co-host.)

== History ==
=== Ancient and medieval period ===
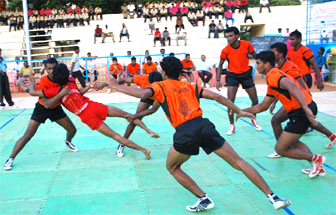
A team tackle occurring in the ancient Indian game of kabaddi.

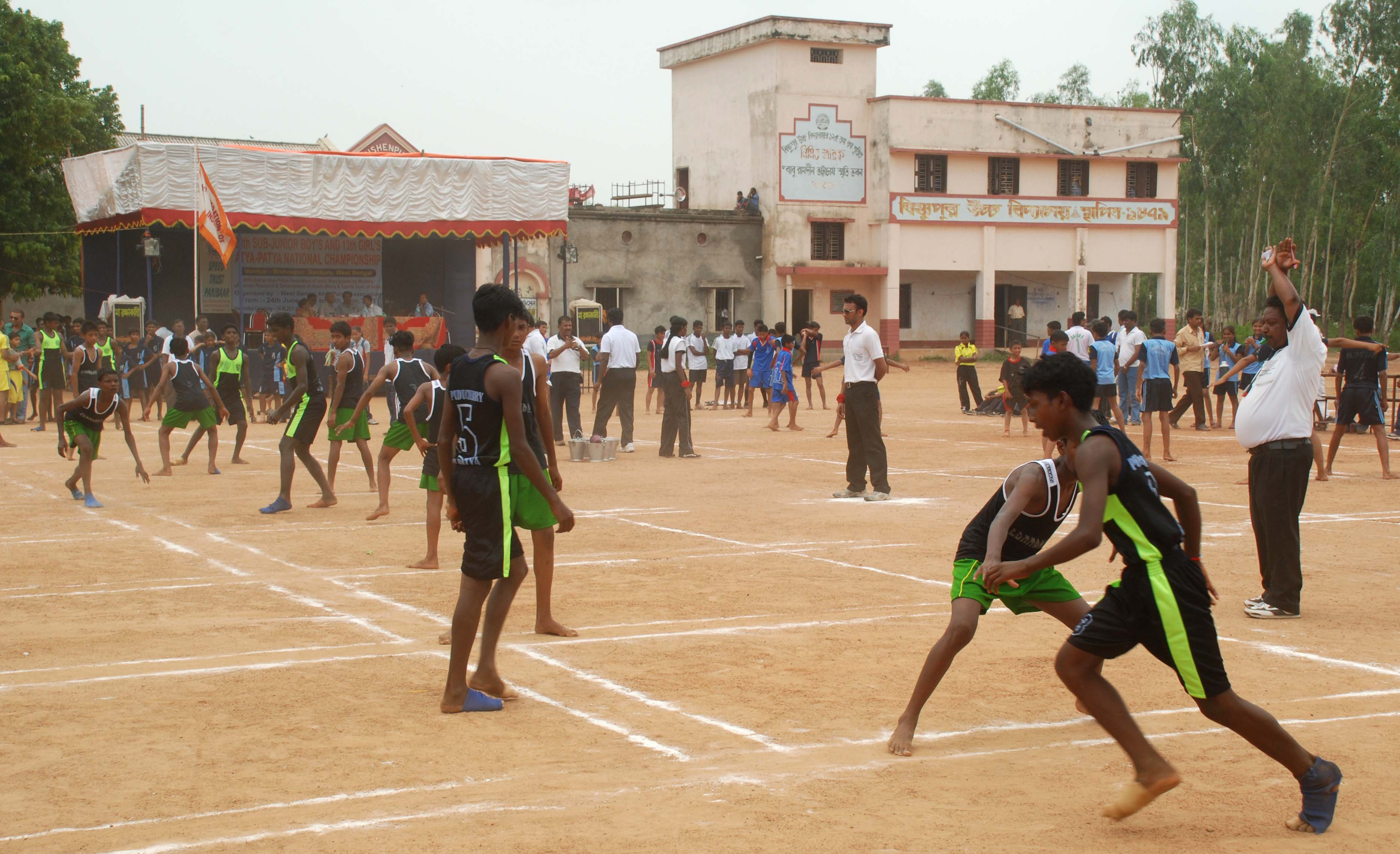
An attacker (front right) trying to run past a defender in atya-patya.

The world's oldest stadium with terraced stands was constructed in Dholavira, Gujarat, during the third millennium BCE. Two stadiums have been identified at the ancient site: one is considered a ceremonial ground, and the other a small stadium. Sports were evident during the Vedic era.

The modern game of badminton developed from an English children's game known as battledore and shuttlecock, a game that was most prominent in ancient India. The battledore was a paddle and the shuttlecock was a small feathered cork, colloquially called a bird.

India has a rich heritage of martial arts. In the Mahabharata and Ramayana, Bhima and Hanuman were the greatest Gadadhari (transl. One who fights with Gada (the Mace weapon)) and were skilled in wrestling. Lord Krishna's brother Balarama was a great Gadadhari. During the era of the Mahabharata, which is a tale of warring cousins (Pandavas and Kauravas), Pandava prince Arjun and Ekalavya were expert archers. Tradition held that the epic encompassed all aspects of Indian life; a common saying suggests that what is not found within it does not exist or is not true. Going back to the history of sports, martial arts was one of the earliest sport used for military purposes. This too was limited to only the warrior caste, the Kshatriya. Ancient India restricted their sports to only men, just like Ancient Greece, as the patriarchy was very strict.

Board games, including chess and snakes and ladders, originated from the ancient Indian games chaturanga and gyan chauper respectively; these were later brought to foreign countries, where they would be modernized. Chaturanga taught ancient Indians how to strategise for war, and the other board games often imparted spiritual values.

Several Indian variations of tag, such as kabaddi and kho-kho, originated in prehistoric times, with kho-kho being played as far back as the fourth century BCE. Atya-patya, a variant of tag, was mentioned in the Naṟṟiṇai (written in 300 CE). Kabaddi and atya-patya in particular were used for military training purposes. During the rule of the Mughal Empire, pehlwani, a form of wrestling, was developed by combining native malla-yuddha with the Persian varzesh-e bastani.

Several other activities were partaken in for recreation, such as hunting, gambling in dice-games, etc.

=== British Colonial period ===
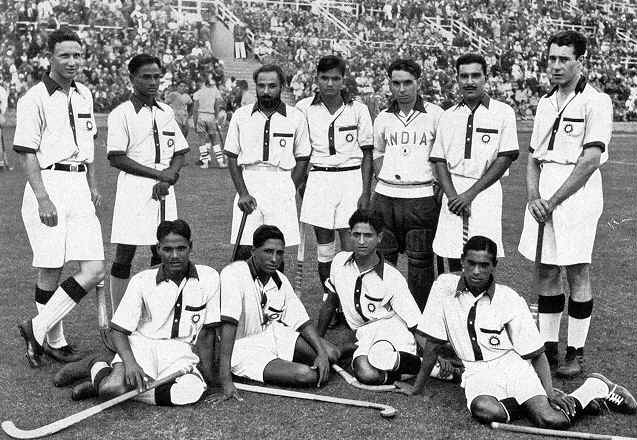
The Indian Hockey team at the 1936 Berlin Olympics, later going on to defeat Germany 8–1 in the final.

During the colonial period, British India (Note: British India included present India, Pakistan and Bangladesh nations.) competed at six Olympic Games, winning medals in field hockey. (Note: Due to misinformation many believes that hockey is national sport/game of India, but it is wrong. There is no national sport/game of India. Sports ministry of India told in an answer to RTI question in 2020, that there is no official national game of India.) British sports were introduced into India during that period. Some Indians were variously participating in British sports to rise up the social hierarchy by imitating their colonisers as well as aiming to achieve victory against the British in their sports. The British also aimed to spread their sports among Indians as a way of spreading British values. Efforts were made to develop the native games of India during this time period; this led to the successful standardisation of games such as kabaddi and kho-kho, as well as their demonstration in the 1936 Summer Olympics. However, the economic struggles prevailing at the time limited people's overall ability to participate in sport.

In the early days, the British began clubs, which only whites could join. These clubs were a place where men could gather together to drink, socialize, and play sports. British soldiers would play British sports as a way of maintaining fitness, since the mortality rate for foreigners in India was high at the time, as well as to maintain a sense of Britishness. The games played in the clubs included cricket, badminton, rugby, golf, and rowing.

Snooker originated in the late 19th century among British Army officers stationed in India. Modern polo originated in British India in the 19th century (Note: Although polo had been played since the medieval period, the modern version was conceptualized in British India.) in Manipur, where the game was known as Sagol Kangjei, Kanjai-bazee, or Pulu. The name polo is the anglicized version of the lattermost term.

Dorabji Tata, with the support of Dr. A.G. Noehren, the then-director of YMCA, established the Indian Olympic Association in 1927.

One of the world's earliest football clubs, the Mohun Bagan was established in 1889. The club was formed when The Football Association of England began making standard rules for football before FIFA, the international governing body of football was founded.

=== Post-Independence ===
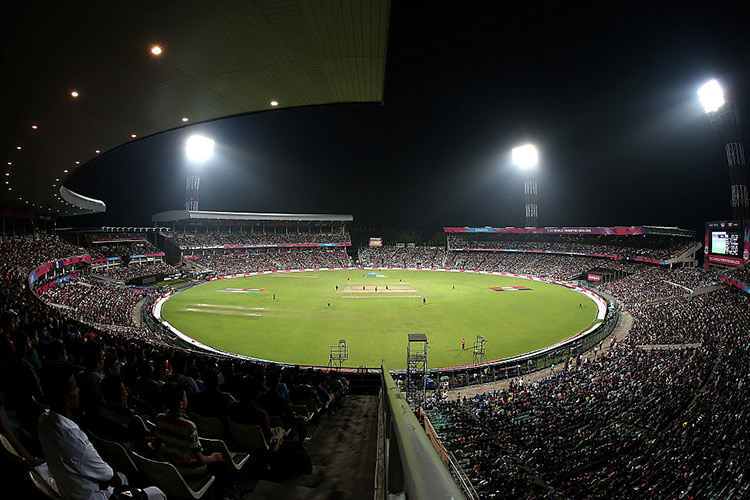
The Eden Gardens in Kolkata, established in 1864, is the oldest cricket stadium in India. It has been part of several historic cricket matches. (Note: Eden Gardens was India's biggest cricket stadium (as per the number of seats) until Narendra Modi stadium was built, containing 130,000 seats.) (Note: Eden Gardens have hosted matches of historic IND vs Aus Test in 11–15 March 2001, 1996 cricket world cup semifinal and 2016 T20 world cup final in which West Indies won)

When India won the 1983 Cricket World Cup, cricket rose to popularity while the former favorite sport, field hockey, was declining. International sports and sporting leagues quickly grew after the economic liberalisation of the 1990s, which allowed more money to be invested into sports. The Indian Premier League (IPL), which started in 2007, quickly became the most dominant league in the country and is highly influential in global cricket; by 2022, it was only behind America's National Football League in terms of being the most valued league in the world on a per-match basis. Several other sports leagues quickly popped up after the IPL, with the Indian Super League becoming one of the biggest leagues and playing a significant role in Indian football. Other leagues (such as the Pro Kabaddi League, Ultimate Kho Kho, and the Pro Panja League) also contributed to the modernisation of indigenous sports. Kabaddi has become an international sport, with countries such as South Korea and Iran playing it.

==== Track record ====
Until the 1970s, poverty limited Indians' ability to play ball sports. Several factors have explained India's lack of success in international sport, such as economic hardship, lack of emphasis on sports other than cricket in Indian culture, corruption, and a lack of investment in sports. Indians seeking to become professional athletes are often encouraged to instead pursue higher-paying professions and help themselves and their families economically; surveys indicate that Indians also spend substantially less time playing sports than people in OECD countries.

==== Government policy ====
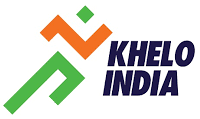
Khelo India logo

The current Ministry of Youth Affairs and Sports was initially set up as the Department of Sports in 1982 at the time of organisation of the Asian Games in New Delhi, an event which had a broad impact in catalysing Indian sport. Its name was changed to the Department of Youth Affairs and Sports during International Youth Year in 1985.

In the early 21st century, the Government of India and Ministry of Youth Affairs and Sports have tried to promote sports in the country by launching and organising new national sports events such as the Khelo India Youth Games (KIYG), the Khelo India Winter Games (KIWG), and the Khelo India University Games (KIUG), which are all competitions under the Khelo India sports development programme, in various cities across the nation. (Note: Khelo means play in Hindi language. 'Khelo India' translates to 'Let's play India' in English.) The first Khelo India School Games was held in 2018. (Note: Khelo India School games are rebranded as Khelo India Youth Games.) KIYG and KIUG are set up as annual events for children and teenagers, who represent their states and universities in them respectively. The Indian government has also tripled its sports budget from 2014 to 2023, and is looking to host the 2036 Olympics.

== Administration ==
The Ministry of Youth Affairs and Sports is a ministry of the Government of India for sport in the country. Anurag Thakur is the incumbent sports minister of India.

The ministry is run by a Secretary to the Government of India, and is usually headed by a Minister of State. A ministry-recognised National Sports Federation Of India (NSFOI) represents each Olympic and non-Olympic sport—the only major exception being the Board of Control for Cricket in India (BCCI), which is not an NSFOI. (Note: BCCI do not come under National Sports Federation of India/Sports ministry of India. It is a private organisation and do not receive any grants from Government of India.) As of 2019, 56 NSFs are recognised by the ministry. The presence of politicians at the helm of many such federations has been criticised for causing inefficiency and corruption.

For each sport, India has a separate governing body. These include the All India Football Federation for football, the National Rifle Association of India for shooting, and the Boxing Federation of India for boxing.

The Indian Olympic Association (IOA) is responsible for the Indian contingent's participation in the Olympic Games, Commonwealth Games, Asian Games (outdoor, indoor and beach), South Asian Games, Lusofonia Games, World Games and Military World Games. The selection of the national teams is done by the respective national federations and then recommended to the IOA for official sponsorship for participation in those games. The Paralympic Committee of India is responsible for the Indian participation in the Paralympic Games and Asian Para Games. The All India Sports Council for the Deaf is responsible for India's participation in the Deaflympics Games, and the Special Olympics Bharat is responsible for India's participation in the Special Olympics.

The Association of Indian Universities is responsible for India participating in the Universiade Games, while the School Games Federation of India is responsible for India's participation in the Gymnasiade Games.

== Hosting history ==
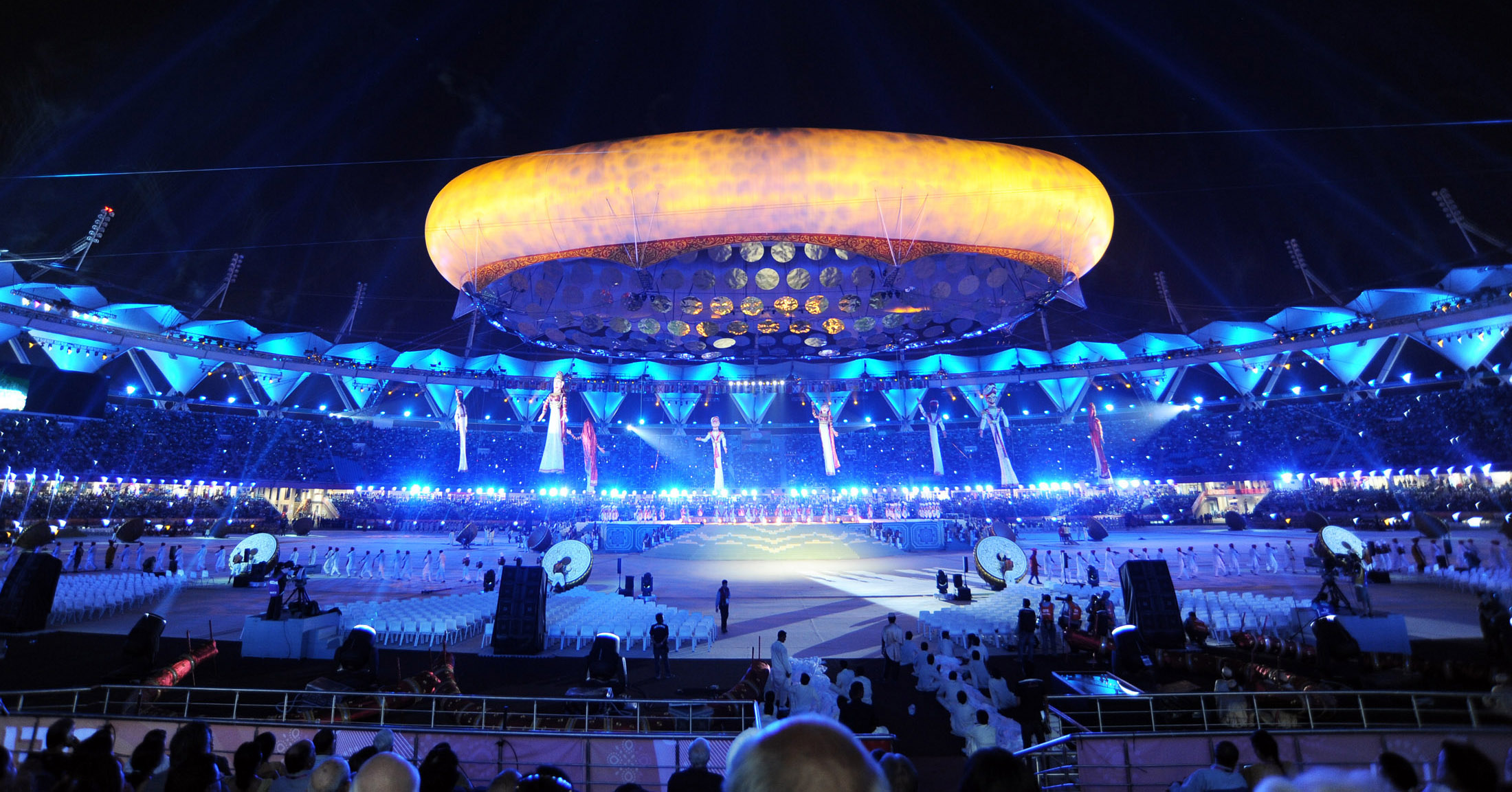
Jawaharlal Nehru Stadium, Delhi during the opening ceremony of 2010 Commonwealth Games

India founded the Asian Games, which is considered to be the world's second-largest sporting event behind the Olympic Games, as a way to make itself relevant in the new post-colonial world order. It hosted the Games in New Delhi for the inaugural edition in 1951 and again in 1982. India has also hosted and co-hosted several international sporting events, including the 1987, 1996, 2011, and 2023 Cricket World Cups, the 2003 Afro-Asian Games, the 2007 Military World Games, the 2010 Hockey World Cup, the 2008 Commonwealth Youth Games, and the 2010 and 2030 Commonwealth Games. Major international sporting events annually held in India include the India Open, the WTA Indian Open, the Bengaluru Open, the Chennai Open Challenger, the Mumbai Marathon and the Delhi Half Marathon. The country hosted the first Indian Grand Prix in 2011.

Other hosted international sporting events include the 1987, 1995, and 2016 South Asian Games; the 2014 Lusofonia Games; the 1987, 1996, (Note: Sri Lanka–Pakistan co-hosted 1996 ODI ICC Cricket world cup with India.) 2006, 2011, 2016, 2021, (Note: 2021 ICC T20 world cup was scheduled to take place in India but it was moved to UAE due to COVID-19 outbreak in the nation. But hosting rights as well as commercial benefits remained to India (BCCI).) 2023, and 2026 ICC men's cricket world cups, and the 1978, 1997, 2013, 2016, and 2025 ICC women's cricket world cups. India has hosted editions of the SAFF Championship in 1999, 2011, 2015, 2023; SAFF Women's Championship in 2016 and 2026, and junior FIFA world cups including the 2017 FIFA U-17 World Cup, 2022 FIFA U-17 Women's World Cup of football.

The following is a list of international sports events held in India:

International hosting record
Sport	Tournament	Year	Venue
Multi-sport event	Asian Games	1951	Delhi
Table tennis	World Table Tennis Championships	1952	Mumbai
Billiards	IBSF World Billiards Championship	1952	Kolkata
Snooker	IBSF World Snooker Championship	1958	Kolkata
Snooker	IBSF World Snooker Championship	1963	Kolkata
Snooker	IBSF World Snooker Championship	1973	Mumbai
Table tennis	World Table Tennis Championships	1975	Kolkata
Wrestling	Asian Wrestling Championships	1979	Jalandhar
Boxing	Men's Asian Amateur Boxing Championships	1980	Mumbai
Football	AFC Women's Championship	1980	Kozhikode
Table tennis	Asian Table Tennis Championships	1980	Kolkata
Archery	Asian Archery Championships	1980	Kolkata
Basketball	FIBA Asia Cup	1981	Kolkata
Snooker	IBSF World Snooker Championship	1981	Delhi
Table tennis	Commonwealth Table Tennis Championships	1982	Mumbai
Field hockey	Field Hockey World Cup	1982	Mumbai
Multi-sport event	Asian Games	1982	Delhi
Table tennis	World Table Tennis Championships	1987	Delhi
Cricket (ODI)	Cricket World Cup	1987	Multiple venues
Wrestling	Asian Wrestling Championships	1987	Mumbai
Snooker	IBSF World Snooker Championship	1987	Bengaluru
Multi-sport event	South Asian Games	1987	Kolkata
Archery	Asian Archery Championships	1988	Kolkata
Snooker	ACBS Asian Snooker Championship	1989	India
Cycling	Asian Cycling Championships	1989	Delhi
Rowing	Asian Rowing Championships	1989	Chandigarh
Athletics	Asian Athletics Championships	1989	Delhi
Snooker	IBSF World Snooker Championship	1990	Bengaluru
Wrestling	Asian Wrestling Championships	1991	Delhi
Table tennis	Asian Table Tennis Championships	1992	Delhi
Badminton	Badminton World Cup	1993	Delhi
Table tennis	Commonwealth Table Tennis Championships	1994	Hyderabad
Judo	Asian Judo Championships	1995	Delhi
Multi-sport event	South Asian Games	1995	Chennai
Cricket (ODI)	Cricket World Cup	1996	Multiple venues
Field hockey	Men's Hockey Champions Trophy	1996	Chennai
Cricket (ODI)	Women's Cricket World Cup	1997	Multiple venues
Basketball	FIBA Asia Under-18 Championship	1998	Kolkata
Football	SAFF Gold Cup	1999	Multiple venues
Chess	World Chess Championship	2000	Delhi
Table tennis	Commonwealth Table Tennis Championships	2001	Delhi
Wrestling	Asian Wrestling Championships	2003	Delhi
Multi-sport event	Afro-Asian Games	2003	Hyderabad
Boxing	Women's Asian Amateur Boxing Championships	2003	Hisar District
Canoeing	Asian Canoeing Championships Canoe sprint	2003	Bhopal
Kabaddi	Kabaddi World Cup (International Kabaddi Federation)	2004	Mumbai
Basketball	FIBA Asia Under-18 Championship	2004	Bengaluru
Sailing	Asian Sailing Championship	2004	Mumbai
Half marathon	IAAF World Half Marathon Championships	2004	Delhi
Marathon	IAAF Road Race Label Events Mumbai Marathon	2004–(recur)	Mumbai
Half marathon	IAAF Road Race Label Events Delhi Half Marathon	2005–(recur)	Delhi
Rowing	Asian Rowing Championships	2005	Hyderabad
Cycling	Asian Cycling Championships	2005	Ludhiana
Field hockey	Men's Hockey Champions Trophy	2005	Chennai
Archery	Asian Archery Championships	2005	Delhi
Boxing	AIBA Women's World Boxing Championships	2006	Delhi
Cricket (ODI)	ICC Champions Trophy	2006	Multiple venues
Gymnastics	Asian Artistic Gymnastics Championships	2006	Surat
Gymnastics	Rhythmic Gymnastics Asian Championships	2006	Surat
Multi-sport event	Military World Games	2007	Hyderabad and Secunderabad
Table tennis	Commonwealth Table Tennis Championships	2007	Jaipur
Squash	World Team Squash Championships	2007	Chennai
Kabaddi	Kabaddi World Cup (International Kabaddi Federation)	2007	Panvel
Beach volleyball	Asian Beach Volleyball Championship	2008	Hyderabad
Boxing	Women's Asian Amateur Boxing Championships	2008	Guwahati
Football	AFC Challenge Cup	2008	Delhi; Hyderabad
Multi-sport event	Commonwealth Youth Games	2008	Pune
Badminton	BWF World Junior Championships	2008	Pune
Snooker	IBSF World Snooker Championship	2008	Bengaluru
Badminton	BWF World Championships	2009	Hyderabad
Snooker	IBSF World Snooker Championship	2009	Hyderabad
Basketball	FIBA Asia Championship for Women	2009	Chennai
Table tennis	Asian Table Tennis Championships	2009	Lucknow
Snooker	IBSF World Snooker Championship	2010	Maharashtra
Wrestling	Asian Wrestling Championships	2010	Delhi
Field hockey	Field Hockey World Cup	2010	Delhi
Multi-sport event	Commonwealth Games	2010	Delhi
Field hockey	Men's Hockey Champions Trophy	2011	Delhi
Roll ball	Roll Ball World Cup	2011	Pune
Football	SAFF Championship	2011	Multiple venues
Cricket (ODI)	Cricket World Cup	2011	Multiple venues
Snooker	ACBS Asian Snooker Championship	2011	Indore
Multi-sport event	South Asian Winter Games	2011	Dehradun and Auli
Snooker	IBSF World Snooker Championship	2011	Bengaluru
Motor sports	Formula One 2011 Indian Grand Prix	2011	Greater Noida
Field hockey	2012 Summer Olympics (London); Qualification Tournament 1	2012	Delhi
Table tennis	World Junior Table Tennis Championships	2012	Hyderabad
Ice hockey	IIHF Challenge Cup of Asia	2012	Dehradun
Motor sports	Formula One 2012 Indian Grand Prix	2012	Greater Noida
Field hockey	FIH Men's Hockey World League (2013 Round 2 (Delhi leg))	2012–13 season	Delhi
Field hockey	FIH Men's Hockey World League (2013 Round 4 (Final round))	2012–13 season	Delhi
Field hockey	FIH Women's Hockey World League (2013 Round 2 (Delhi leg))	2012–13 season	Delhi
Wrestling	Asian Wrestling Championships	2013	Delhi
Canoeing	Asian Canoeing Championships Canoe Polo	2013	Delhi
Table tennis	Commonwealth Table Tennis Championships	2013	Delhi
Cycling	Asian Cycling Championships	2013	Delhi
Motor sports	Formula One 2013 Indian Grand Prix	2013	Greater Noida
Athletics	Asian Athletics Championships	2013	Pune
Cricket (ODI)	Women's Cricket World Cup	2013	Multiple venues
Chess	World Chess Championship	2013	Chennai
Multi-sport event	Lusofonia Games	2014	Goa
Squash	World University Squash Championships	2014	Chennai
Bodybuilding	WBPF World Championship	2014	Mumbai
Tennis	Davis Cup World Group play-offs	2014	Bengaluru
Snooker	IBSF World Snooker Championship	2014	Bengaluru
Badminton	Thomas Cup Uber Cup	2014	Delhi
Field hockey	Men's Hockey Champions Trophy	2014	Bhubaneswar
Field hockey	FIH Women's Hockey World League (2015 Round 2 (Delhi leg))	2014–15 season	Delhi
Field hockey	FIH Men's Hockey World League (2015 Round 4 (Final round))	2014–15 season	Raipur
Golf	Asian Tour Indian Open (golf)	2015	Delhi
Football	SAFF Championship	2015	Multiple venues
Weightlifting	Commonwealth Weightlifting Championship	2015	Pune
Table tennis	Commonwealth Table Tennis Championships	2015	Surat
Snooker	IBSF World Snooker Championship	2016	Bengaluru
Football	SAFF Women's Championship	2016	Multiple venues
Cricket (T20)	ICC World Twenty20	2016	Multiple venues
Cricket (T20)	ICC Women's World Twenty20	2016	Multiple venues
Kabaddi	Kabaddi World Cup (International Kabaddi Federation)	2016	Ahmedabad
Golf	Asian Tour Indian Open (golf)	2016	Delhi
Multi-sport event	South Asian Games	2016	Guwahati and Shillong
Athletics	Asian Athletics Championships	2017	Bhubaneswar
Badminton	BWF World Senior Championships	2017	Kochi
Combat	ISF Combat Games	2017	Agra
Wrestling	Asian Wrestling Championships	2017	Delhi
Cycling	Asian Cycling Championships	2017	Delhi
Badminton	BWF Super Series India Open	2017	Delhi
Squash	Asian Individual Squash Championships	2017	Chennai
Shooting	ISSF World Cup	2017	Delhi
Table tennis	ITTF World Tour India Open (table tennis)	2017	Delhi
Football	FIFA U-17 World Cup	2017	Multiple venues
Basketball	FIBA Asia Women's Cup	2017	Bengaluru
Basketball	FIBA Asia Under-16 Championship for Women	2017	Bengaluru
Boxing	AIBA Women's Youth World Championships	2017	Guwahati
Golf	Asian Tour Indian Open (golf)	2017	Gurugram
Lawn Bowls	Asian Lawn Bowls Championships	2017	Delhi
Lawn Bowls	Asian Under 25 Lawn Bowls Championship	2017	Delhi
Field hockey	FIH Men's Hockey World League (2017 Round 4 (Final round))	2016–17 season	Bhubaneswar
Field hockey	Field Hockey World Cup	2018	Bhubaneswar
Golf	Asian Tour Indian Open (golf)	2018	Gurugram
Boxing	AIBA Women's World Boxing Championships	2018	Delhi
Table tennis	Commonwealth Table Tennis Championships	2019	Cuttack
Wrestling	Asian Wrestling Championships	2020	Delhi
Field hockey	Men's FIH Hockey Junior World Cup	2021	Bhubaneswar
Football	AFC Women's Asian Cup	2022	Multiple venues
Handball	2022 Asian Men's Club League Handball Championship	2022	Hyderabad
Badminton	Odisha Open	2022	Cuttak
Chess	Chess Olympiad	2022	Chennai
Basketball	FIBA Under-18 Women's Asian Championship	2022	Bengaluru
Track Cycling	Asian Cycling Championships	2022	Delhi
Powerboat racing	F1 Powerboat World Championship	2022	Mumbai
Field hockey	Men's FIH Pro League	2022	Bhubaneswar
Football	FIFA U-17 Women's World Cup	2022	Multiple venues
Field hockey	Men's FIH Pro League	2023	Bhubaneswar
Football	SAFF Championship	2023	Multiple venues
Motor sports	Grand Prix motorcycle racing	2023	Greater Noida
Field hockey	Men's FIH Hockey World Cup	2023	Bhubaneswar and Rourkela
Weightlifting	Commonwealth Weightlifting Championship	2023	Greater Noida
Cricket (ODI)	Cricket World Cup	2023	Multiple venues
Field hockey	Women's Asian Champions Trophy	2023	Ranchi
Weightlifting	Asian Youth & Junior Weightlifting Championship	2023	Delhi
Weightlifting	Commonwealth Senior, Junior & Youth Weightlifting Championships	2023	Delhi
Field hockey	Women's Asian Champions Trophy	2024	Rajgir
Kho kho	Kho Kho World Cup	2025	Delhi
Aquatics	Asian Aquatics Championships	2025	Ahmedabad
Weightlifting	Commonwealth Weightlifting Championship	2025	Ahmedabad
Para-athletics	World Para Athletics Championships	2025	Delhi
Cricket (ODI)	Women's Cricket World Cup	2025	Multiple venues
Football	SAFF Women's Championship	2026	Multiple venues
Football	AFC U-17 Asian Cup qualification	2026	Ahmedabad
Badminton	BWF World Junior Championships	2025	Guwahati
Badminton	BWF World Championships	2026	Delhi
Cricket (Twenty20)	Men's ICC T20 World Cup	2026	Multiple venues
Beach volleyball	Bhubaneswar Challenge	2026	Bhubaneswar
Weightlifting	Asian Weightlifting Championships	2026	Gandhinagar
Table tennis	Commonwealth Table Tennis Championships	2026	Delhi
Volleyball	AVC Men's Volleyball Cup	2026	Ahmedabad
Multi-sport event	BIMSTEC Games	2027	To be Decided
Athletics	Asian Relays	2027	Chandigarh
Athletics	Asian Indoor Athletics Championships	2028	Bhubaneswar
Athletics	World Athletics Indoor Championships	2028	Bhubaneswar
Multi-sport event	World Police and Fire Games	2029	Ahmedabad
Multi-sport event	Commonwealth Games	2030	Ahmedabad
Cricket (ODI)	Men's ICC ODI World Cup	2031	Multiple venues

== Multi-sport events performance ==
=== Olympic and Paralympic Games ===
Athlete Norman Pritchard represented India in the 1900 Olympics, winning two silver medals. India sent its first national team to the Olympics in 1920 and has participated in every Summer Olympic Games ever since. India has also competed at several Winter Olympic Games since 1964, but has won no medals; the country has never participated at the Winter Paralympic Games. At the Youth Olympic Games, India has won several medals during Summer editions but has never won a medal at a Winter edition.

As of 2024, India has won a total of 41 Summer Olympic medals and 60 Summer Paralympic medals. India won its first gold medal in men's field hockey at the 1928 Olympic Games. On winning the 10m air rifle event at the 2008 Olympics, Abhinav Bindra became the first Indian to win an individual gold medal at the Olympic Games. In 2021, Neeraj Chopra won the men's javelin throw gold medal at the Tokyo 2020 Olympics.

=== Commonwealth and Asian Games ===
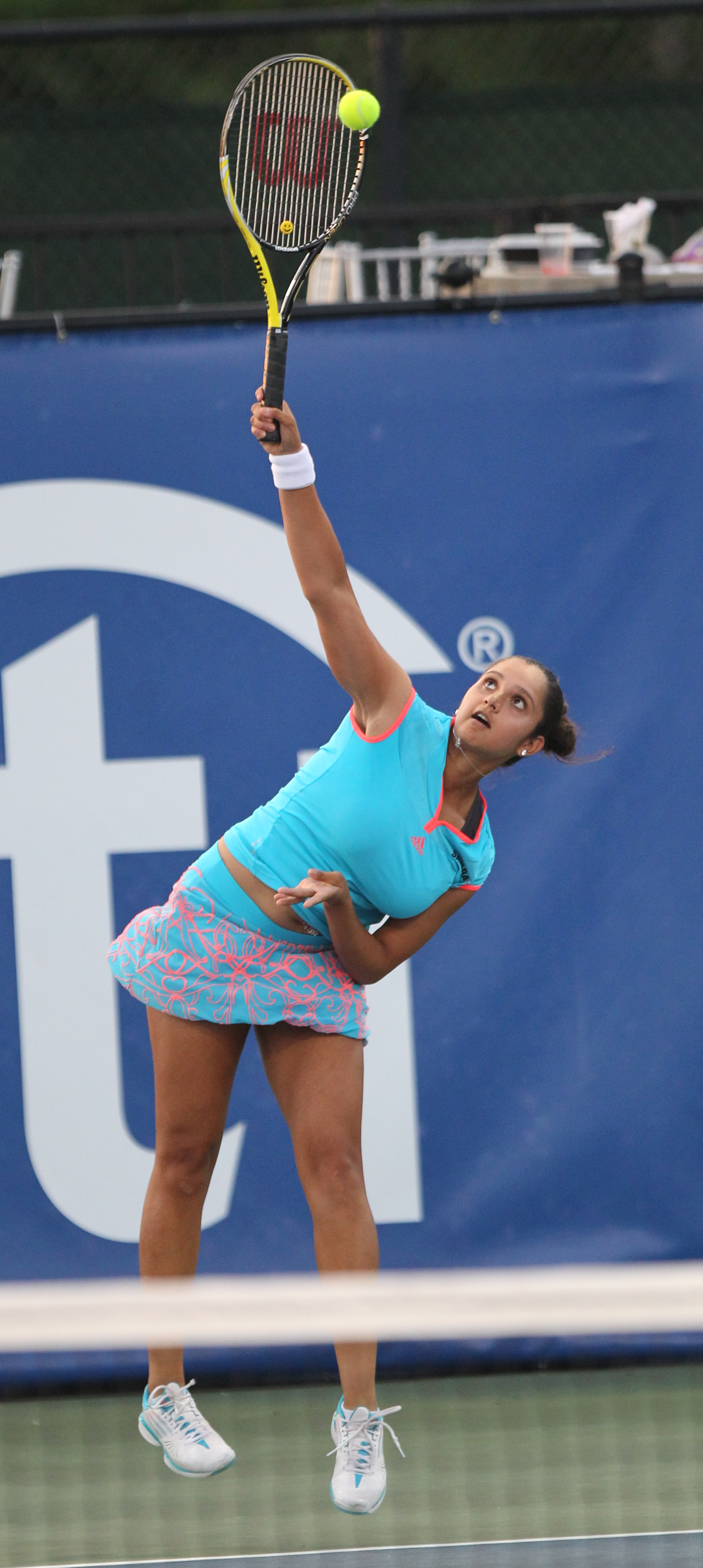
Tennis player Sania Mirza has won multiple medals, including in various Grand Slam events, Commonwealth Games, and Asian Games.

India has competed in all but four editions of the Commonwealth Games since the second Game in 1934. India has hosted the Commonwealth Games in 2010 in Delhi, and will host it again in 2030 in Ahmedabad. India has won a total of 564 medals, including 203 gold medals as of 2022.

India has participated in every edition of the Asian Games, and has hosted the Games in 1951 and 1982 in New Delhi. As of 2018, India has won 671 medals, of which 139 are gold. India has won at least one gold medal in each tournament; its performance in the Asian Games has improved significantly in recent years.

=== Other appearances ===
India has participated in every edition of the World Games (where they won five medals) and the South Asian Games (where they ranked first place). India has also participated in the Lusofonia Games.

India was in the Deaflympics Games, Special Olympics Games, Military World Games, Universiade Games, Gymnasiade Games, and Paralympic Games.

=== National Games of India ===
National Games of India are conducted by the Indian Olympic Association and are meant to identify athletes who would later go for the Olympics. The first National Games (formerly called the Indian Olympic Games), were held in Lahore in 1924, while the first modern Games were held in New Delhi in 1985.

== Olympic sports ==
=== Archery ===
Historically, archery was played and practiced by royals. Modern archery in India began in the early 1970s before its introduction as an Olympic event in 1972, and it was formalised in 1973 when the Archery Association of India (AAI) was established. Since its inception, AAI has been creating and maintaining the rules of the sport. In Paris 2024 Summer Olympics, Ankita Bhakat and Dhiraj Bommadevara finished fourth in mixed doubles of Recurve Archery.

=== Athletics ===
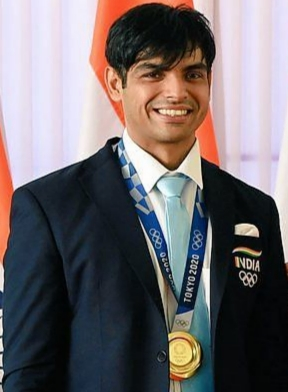
Neeraj Chopra is a 2020 Summer Olympics gold medalist, Diamond league 2022 champion, and a World Athletics Championship 2022 medalist in javelin throwing.

The Athletics Federation of India (AFI) is the national governing body of athletics in India. India is not a major competitor in athletics. As of 2024, India has won four medals in the Summer Olympics.

Norman Pritchard was the first Indian Olympic athlete. He won an Olympic medal for India as a sprinter and won two silver medals in the 200m sprint and 200m hurdle track and field event at the 1900 Summer Olympics. Neeraj Chopra won the first Olympic gold medal in track and field for India at the 2020 Summer Olympics, also winning a medal in the javelin throw event.

Anju Bobby George won the bronze medal in the women's long jump at the 2003 World Championships in Athletics in Paris. She became the first Indian athlete to win a medal in a World Championships in Athletics, jumping 6.7 m (22 ft) in 2010. For 52 years, Milkha Singh was the only athlete to win an individual gold medal at a Commonwealth Games; however, at the 2010 Commonwealth Games, Krishna Punia won the women's discus throw gold medal for India and was the first Indian woman to be a gold medalist in athletics at the Commonwealth Games. At the 2014 Commonwealth Games, Vikas Gowda won the Men's Discus Throw gold medal.

Hima Das is the only Indian track athlete to win a medal at any World Athletics global event. She won the gold medal in Women's 400 metres at the 2018 IAAF World U20 Championships in Tampere, Finland, on 12 July 2018, clocking at a time of 51.46 seconds. She is the second gold medalist in athletics at the IAAF World U20 Championships after Chopra, who won men's javelin throw gold at 2016 IAAF World U20 Championships by setting the world junior record with a throw of 86.48 m (283.7 ft). Chopra later won gold in the men's javelin throw at the 2018 Commonwealth Games. In 2020, at the Tokyo Olympics, he became the first Indian athlete to win an Olympic gold medal in men's javelin throw. (Note: Neeraj Chopra was also the first Asian to win an Olympic gold medal in Javelin throw.) At the 2016 Summer Olympics, Lalita Babar became the first Indian athlete since 1984 to reach the Olympics finale in the event of the Women's 3000 metres steeplechase. Before her, P.T. Usha reached the finale of the Women's 400 metres hurdles at the 1984 Summer Olympics.

P.T. Usha won multiple gold medals in different editions of the Asian Games and Asian Athletics Championships. Lavy Pinto was the first Indian to win a gold medal in the Asian Games. Pinto also won a gold medal in the first Asian Games held at New Delhi in 1951 in the 100- and 200-meter categories. Christine Brown, Stephie D'Souza, Violet Peters, and Mary D'Souza won the first gold medal in women's athletics for India in the 4 × 100 m relay in the 1954 Asian Games. Kamaljeet Sandhu was the first female Indian athlete to win an individual gold medal at any Asian games in the 400m track event at the 1970 Asian Games. Sunita Rani holds the current Asian record in the 1500 m track event winning at the Busan 2002 Asian Games at a time of 4:06.03.

Madhurjya Borah, an Indian triathlete, holds the silver medal for the South Asian Triathlon Championship. Triathlete Anu Vaidyanathan was the first Asian to compete in Ultraman. In May 2016, Arunaabh Shah became the first Indian male and the youngest Indian to finish Ultraman at Ultraman Australia.

Neeraj Chopra became the first India athlete to win the Diamond League trophy in Zürich, Switzerland, in 2022 by throwing a javelin 88.44 m (290.2 ft). On 24 July 2022, he won the silver medal in the 2022 World Athletics Championships in Oregon; he is the only athlete from India to have done so.

In the 2022 Commonwealth Games, Avinash Sable and Priyanka Goswami won the first silver medals for India in the games' history and in any major multinational events in the 3000m steeplechase and 10,000m racewalking events respectively.

=== Badminton ===
P V Sindhu and Thomas Cup winning team

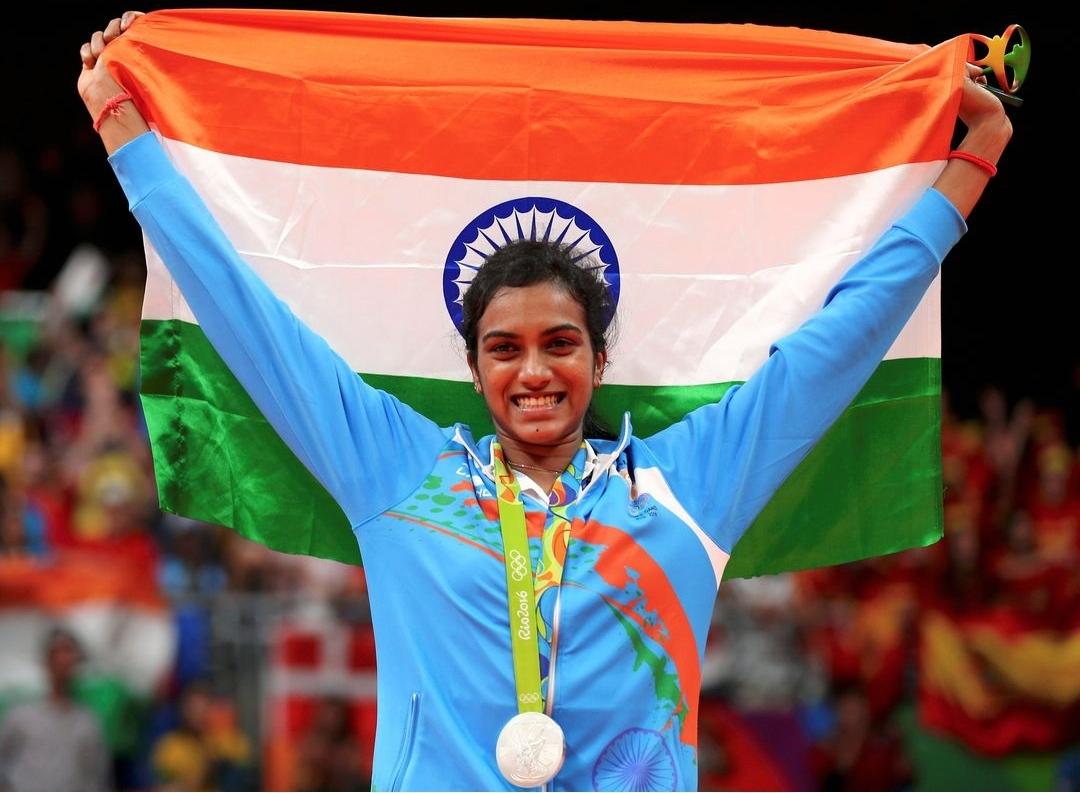
Indian shuttler Sindhu, Bronze, Silver Olympic medalist, world number one and winner of many international championships

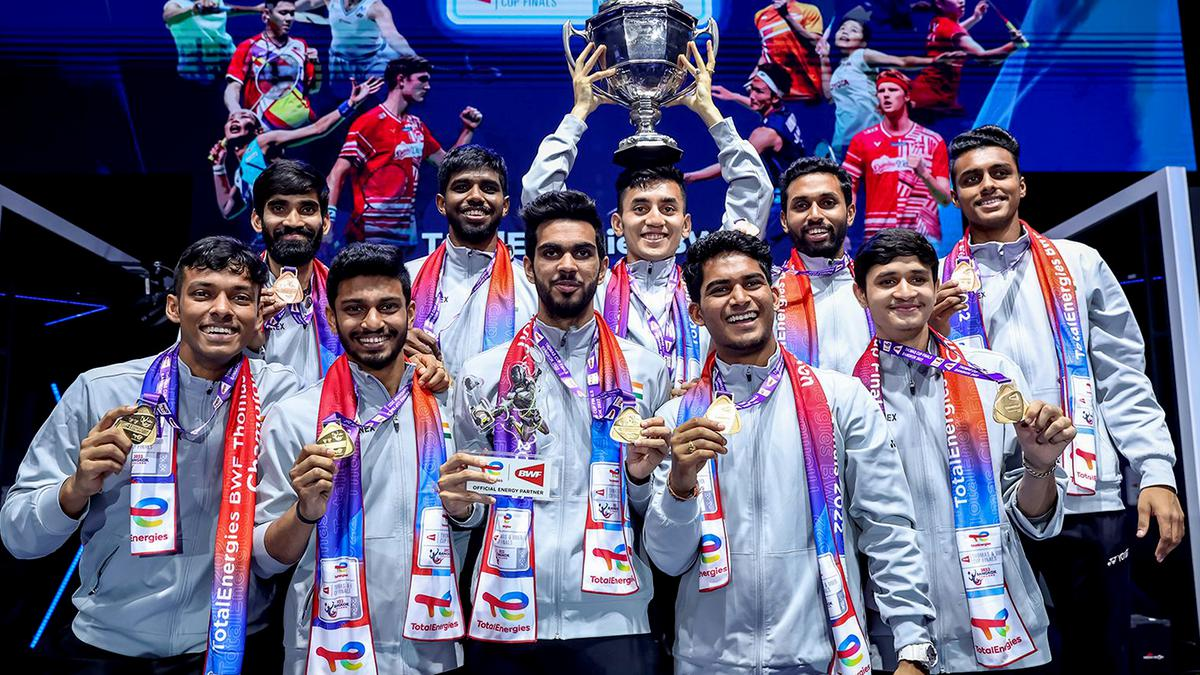
Indian shuttlers, after winning their first ever Thomas Cup 2022.

Indian badminton players

Badminton is a popular sport in India, specifically in South India; people often play it as a recreational activity. The region has multiple badminton academies and coaching facilities.

The Badminton Association of India (BAI) is the national governing body of badminton in India.

In 2022, the Indian Badminton team won for the first time in the Thomas Cup, which is a badminton multinational tournament.

P. V. Sindhu, Srikanth Kidambi, and pair Satwiksairaj Rankireddy and Chirag Shetty are ranked amongst the top ten in the current BWF world rankings. Prakash Padukone was the first player from India to achieve the number one spot. He was the winner of the All England Open Badminton Championships in 1980, which was later won by Pullela Gopichand in 2001. Srikanth Kidambi became the second male player to make it to the top spot in April 2018. In 2015, Saina Nehwal achieved the world number one BWF ranking, and she is the first ever Indian badminton player who won a medal at the Olympics, doing so in 2012.

Sindhu is the first Indian to become the Badminton World Champion, which she achieved in 2019, and is the only badminton player from India to win two consecutive medals at the Olympic Games. In 2016, she won a silver medal, while in 2020, she won bronze.

Doubles player Jwala Gutta is the only Indian to have been ranked in the top 10 in two categories: at number 6 with Valiyaveetil Diju in mixed doubles, and number 10 with Ashwini Ponnappa in women's doubles. Other successful players include Aparna Popat, Syed Modi, Chetan Anand, Parupalli Kashyap, Prannoy H. S., Sameer Verma, Lakshya Sen, Ashwini Ponnappa, and N. Sikki Reddy.

India has also won twelve medals at the BWF World Championships, with Sindhu being the only Indian badminton player to have won gold in 2019. At the BWF World Junior Championships, Nehwal is the only gold medalist for India, winning in 2008. At the Badminton Asia Junior Championships, Sindhu and Lakshya Sen are the only gold medalists for India, winning in 2012 and 2018 respectively.

=== Boxing ===
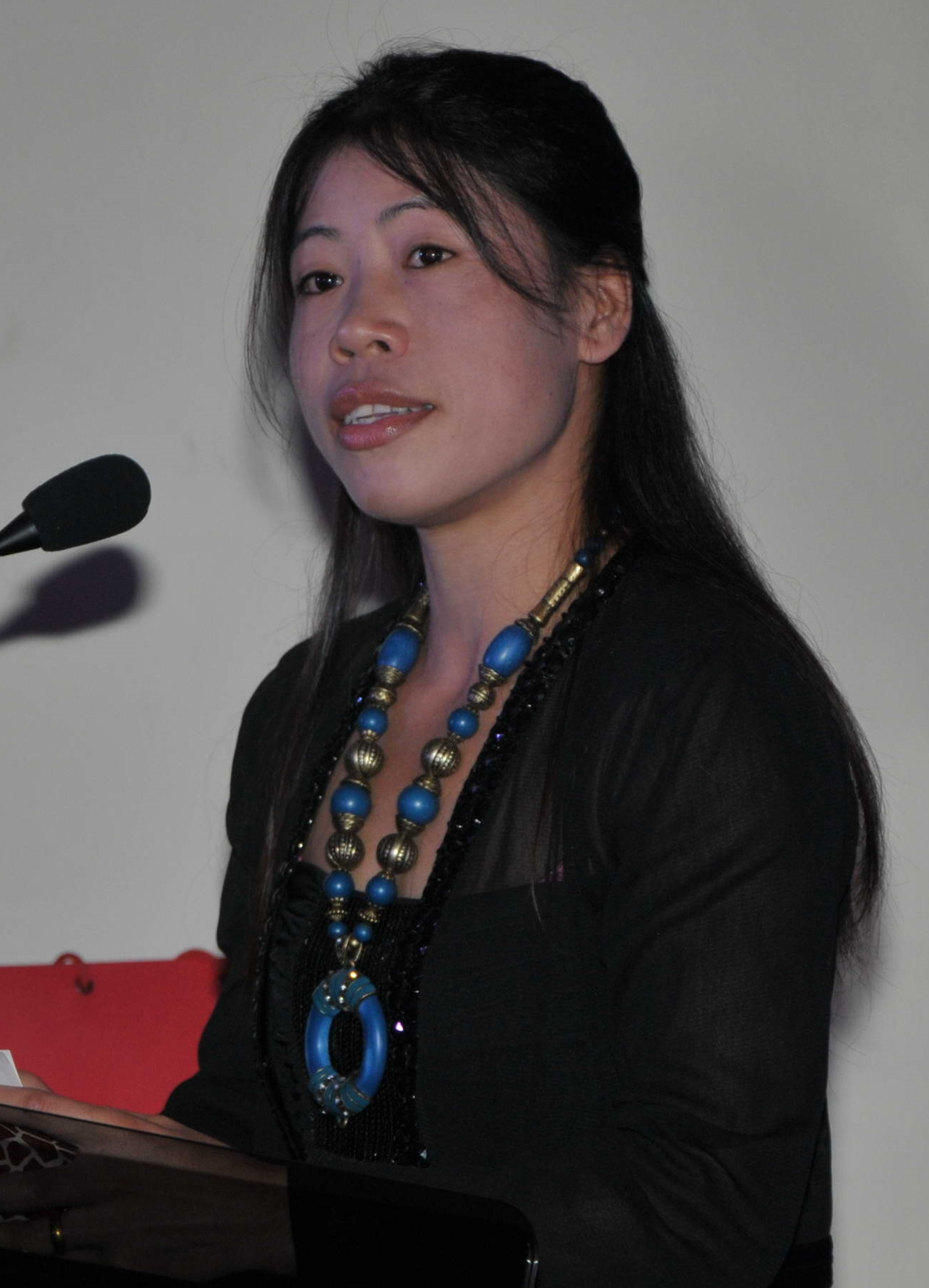
Mary Kom, Olympic medalist, famous Indian amateur boxer

The Boxing Federation of India is the national governing body of the sport. India regularly wins medals in boxing at the Asian Games and Commonwealth Games. In November 2007, Mary Kom won the title of best boxer, securing a hat-trick. During the 2008 Beijing Olympics, Vijender Singh won a bronze medal in the middleweight division, and Akhil Kumar and Jitender Kumar qualified for the quarterfinals. Akhil Kumar, Jitender Kumar, A.L. Lakra, and Dinesh Kumar won a bronze medal at the 2008 World Championship. Kom won the bronze medal at the 2012 London Olympic Games.

=== Cricket ===
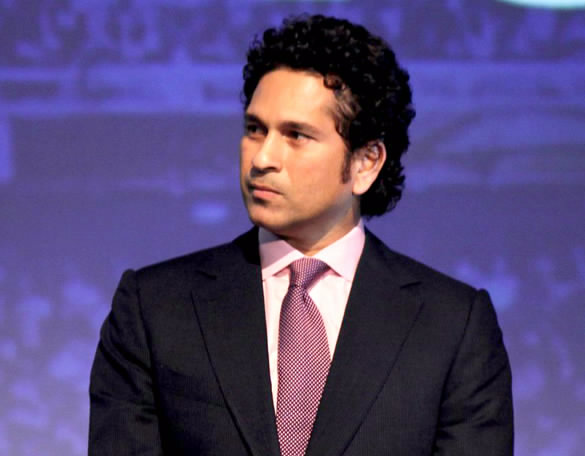
Sachin Tendulkar is widely considered as one of the greatest batters of all time, In a career of 24 years, he has created many batting records

Cricket has a long history in India, having been introduced in the country during British rule. It is the most popular spectator sport in India. India is a cricket powerhouse, having won the Cricket World Cup twice, the T20 World Cup thrice, the Champions Trophy thrice, and the Women's Cricket World Cup once. The governing body for this sport in this nation is the Board of Control for Cricket in India (BCCI). It is the richest cricket board in the world. Cricket is played at the local, national, and international level, and has huge fan following from people in most parts of the nation. Cricket has officially been approved by the International Olympic Committee for inclusion in the 2028 Olympics.

India national cricket team represents India in international cricket. It is colloquially known as "Team India". It played its first Test against England at Lord's in 1932, led by C. K. Nayudu. It is one of the top teams in this sport. Indian women's national cricket team represents India in women's international cricket.

This sport generates high TV viewership during international and Indian Premier League (IPL) matches. India does not have a national game. The governing body for cricket in India, the BCCI, was formed in December 1928 and is based in Mumbai. IPL is the richest cricket league in the world. (Note: IPL is second richest league in the world, just behind USA's National Football League (NFL).) Top players around the world annually come to India to participate in it. BCCI annually organises IPL in Summer across the country. (Note: IPL sold its broadcasting rights for 2023-2027 in 48,390 crore rupees.) There are many cricket broadcasting television channels in India such as Star Sports, Sony Ten etc. and mobile, television OTT applications such as JioHotstar, SonyLIV, Fancode etc.

India will host the 2031 ICC ODI Cricket World Cup.

India has a plethora of cricket stadiums. The country has the biggest stadium in the world, the Narendra Modi Stadium, which has 132,000 seats for viewers. (Note: Narendra Modi stadium is named after present honorable prime minister of India, Narendra Modi. The stadium was his dream project and he planned it, when he was president of Gujarat Cricket Association)

India has hosted or co-hosted many major international cricket tournaments, including the 1987 Cricket World Cup (co-hosted with Pakistan), the 1996 Cricket World Cup (co-hosted with Pakistan and Sri Lanka), the 2006 ICC Champions Trophy, the 2011 Cricket World Cup (co-hosted with Sri Lanka and Bangladesh), and the 2023 Cricket World Cup.

The India national cricket team has won major tournaments, including the 1983 Cricket World Cup in England, the 2002 ICC Champions Trophy with Sri Lanka., (Note: The final match was washed out due to rain and there was no reserve day for play, so the trophy was jointly shared by Sri Lanka and India.) the 2007 T20 World Cup in South Africa, the 2011 Cricket World Cup (which they won by beating Sri Lanka in the final at home), the 2013 ICC Champions Trophy in England, the 2024 T20 World Cup in West Indies, the 2025 ICC Champions Trophy in UAE and the 2026 T20 World Cup in India. It had also held the position of the top team in Tests. In 2021, Team India reached to the final of the inaugural ICC World Test Championship and remained runner-up after losing against New Zealand.

The India women's national cricket team won the 2025 Women's Cricket World Cup by beating South Africa in the final at home.

The biggest domestic competitions include Ranji Trophy, Syed Mushtaq Ali Trophy, Duleep Trophy, Deodhar Trophy, Irani Trophy, Vijay Hazare Trophy and the NKP Salve Challenger Trophy.

=== Field hockey ===
Field hockey, until the mid-1970s, was dominated by the India men's national field hockey team, winning Olympic gold medals and the 1975 Men's Hockey World Cup. Field hockey declined within the country due to changing rules, the introduction of artificial turf, and internal politics in Indian field hockey bodies. In 2008, the men's team failed to qualify for the 2008 Olympics and finished last in the 2012 Olympics.

However, the men's team were second place at the 2014 Commonwealth Games and won gold in field hockey at the 2014 Asian Games. Losing at the quarter final stage of the 2016 Rio Olympics following a loss to Belgium, and won the 2017 Men's Hockey Asia Cup. India, at the 2020 games in Tokyo and 2024 games in Paris, won a bronze medal. As of December 2025, the Indian men's team is ranked 8th in the FIH World Rankings, the international governing body of indoor and outdoor field hockey.

The women's national field hockey team first participated at the Summer Olympics in 1980, achieving fourth place. At the 1982 Asian Games for field hockey, the team won gold. In the 2016 Summer Olympics, the Indian women's team qualified for the Summer Olympics and they went on to win the 2017 Women's Hockey Asia Cup. However, the India Women's team did not win any medals in the Women's Hockey World Cup. The present team is ranked tenth place by the Fédération Internationale de Hockey. India has hosted four times Men's Hockey World Cup. The first in 1982 in Mumbai and second in 2010 in Delhi where the country finished fifth and eighth place respectively. The third in Bhubaneswar in 2018 where the country finished in sixth place and fourth in Bhubaneswar and Rourkela in 2023 where the country finished in ninth place. India also hosted the annual Hockey Champions Trophy in 1996, 2005, and 2014.

Until 2008, the Indian Hockey Federation (IHF) was the apex body for hockey in the country. However, after corruption and other scandals in the IHF, the federation was dissolved, and a new apex body for Indian hockey called Hockey India (HI) was formed on 20 May 2009, with support from the Indian Olympic Association (IOA) and former hockey players. HI, recognized by the International Hockey Federation (FIH), has the sole mandate to govern and conduct all activities for both men's and women's field hockey in India. Although the IHF was reinstated in 2010, it is not recognised by the FIH. The IHF conducts a franchise-based tournament called World Series Hockey (WSH), with its first season conducted in 2012. However, it is not approved by the HI or the FIH. The Government of Odisha has contributed to the revival of Indian Hockey by becoming the first state government in India to sponsor a national team. Also the Government of Odisha built the largest hockey stadium, the Birsa Munda International Hockey Stadium in Rourkela, in 2022 ahead of the 2023 Men's FIH Hockey World Cup.

HI also conducts a franchise-based tournament called the Hockey India League (HIL). Its first season was held in 2013. It is recognised by the FIH, which has also decided to provide a 30-day window for the forthcoming seasons so all top players can participate.

=== Squash ===
The game of Squash is becoming increasingly popular in the country. It is growing in exposure after successes of Indian squash players at major events including the Asian Games and Squash World Cup, with India winning two squash gold medals at the 2022 Asian Games, bronze at the 2023 Squash World Cup and gold at the 2025 Squash World Cup.

Squash Rackets Federation of India (SRFI) is the national federation of Squash in India. SRFI annually organises 'SRFI National Squash championship', the 78th National was held in 2022. SRFI also organised a tour tournament. Joshna Chinappa is 18 time Indian national winner in NSC.

The women's and men's Squash team represents India in international tournaments. In 2016 South Asian Games India men and women team won gold medals.

In Squash world cup 2023, the India team reached semifinal but lost to Malaysia 3–0, before that they defeated Hong Kong and South Africa each with 4–0. Joshna Chinappa and Saurav Ghosal, alongside Tanvi Khanna and Abhay Singh was part of Indian team.

In 2013 Ghoshal became the first Indian to get in top 20 ranking, he reach his career best rank 15. In 2012 Dipika Pallikal achieved the top 10 ranking in the world.

Sourav Ghoshal is among the brilliant athletes of the sport in India. Indian men's team won their maiden gold medal at Asian championship in 2022 and Asian Games 2022 . Ramit Tandon and Ghoshal defeated team of Kuwait 2–0 in the final.

Indian Squash Academy of Chennai is the leading academy of the Squash in the country.

=== Football ===
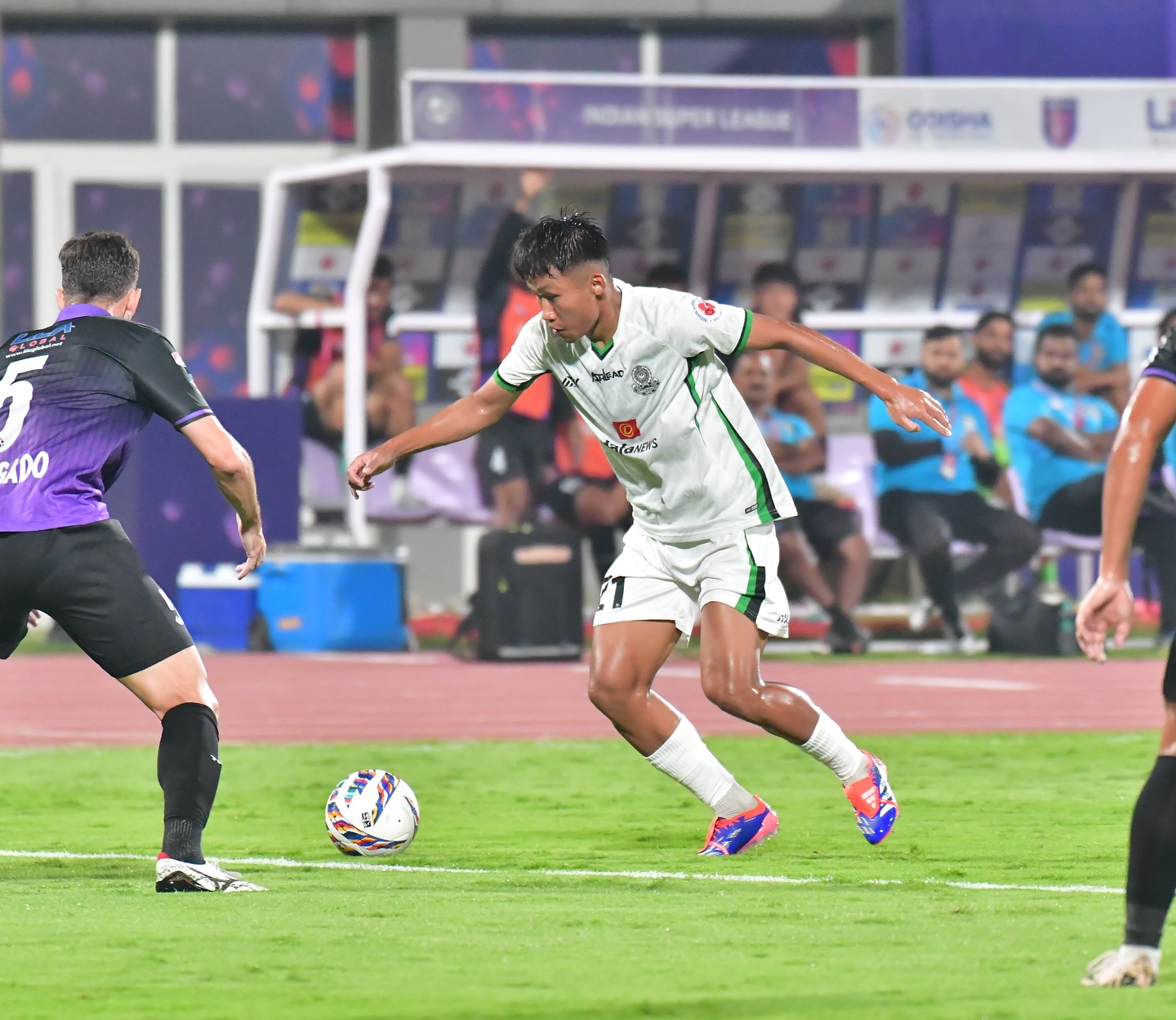
An ISL football match between Odisha FC and Mohammedan SC. Left player Carlos Delgado and right player K. Lalrinfela.

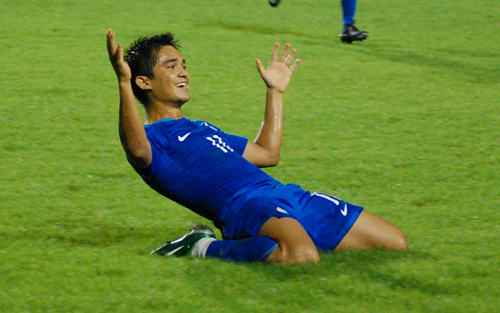
Sunil Chhetri currently ranks as the third-highest active international goalscorer in the world, behind Cristiano Ronaldo and Lionel Messi.

Football was introduced to India during the British colonial period. The All India Football Federation (AIFF) is the national governing body for football in India. It is affiliated with FIFA, the international governing body of football, and the Asian Football Confederation (AFC). Football is the second most popular sport in India after cricket. In states such as Odisha, Tamil Nadu and Karnataka, both football and cricket are equally popular, while football is the dominant sport, more popular than cricket, in West Bengal, Kerala, Goa, Jammu and Kashmir and Northeast India.

Although India has never played in any FIFA World Cups, India qualified for the 1950 FIFA World Cup in Brazil. However, the country did not participate because the team was not allowed to play barefoot. Another excuse that was cited was that the AIFF did not have money to travel to Brazil that time. The barefoot excuse was false, according to a 19 July 2011 Los Angeles Times article. FIFA was ready to give money to the Indian team to travel to Brazil for the World Cup, thus invalidating the money excuse. The barefoot excuse was a "historical blunder" done by AIFF according to the book Box to box: 75 years of the Indian football team, authored by sports journalist Jaydeep Basu. In his book, he revealed that the Indian football team did not play 1950 FIFA World Cup because of "ignorance, short-sightedness, lack of confidence, and misplaced priorities on behalf of the All India Football Federation".

In the 1948 Summer Olympics, India went against France, losing 2–1. (Note: India actually were tied with France at 1 goal all 70 minutes in that first round game of 1948 Olympics. It was first appearance of Indian football team in Olympics after India achieved freedom from British. They did not proceed forward due to first round defeat against France.) During the 1950s and 1960s, known as the golden era, India was the first Asian team to reach the semi-finals in an Olympic football tournament at the 1956 Summer Olympics in Melbourne, and Neville D'Souza became the first Asian and Indian to score a hat-trick in an Olympic match. The men's team have won two gold medals at the Asian Games in 1951 and 1962, and finished in second place at the 1964 AFC Asian Cup. It has won multiple editions of SAFF Championships. In 2023, it won the Intercontinental Cup by defeating Lebanon in the final round.

The Indian women's team also performed very well as finalists in the 1980 and 1983 AFC Women's Asian Cup, secured third place in 1981 AFC Women's Asian Cup, and have also won the SAFF Championship multiple times.

India currently ranks 138th(Men) out of 211 Nations and 69th(Women) out of 196 Nations in the FIFA rankings as of 20 October 2026. Both India national football team and India women's national football team represent India in FIFA, Asian Football Confederation, and international, friendly tournaments in men's and women's football respectively. The Indian Super League and Indian Women's League are considered the top-tier football leagues for Men and Women respectively in India.

In June 1937, at the Army Headquarters in Shimla, the AIFF—the governing body for football in India—was formed during a meeting of the representatives of football associations from six regions where the game was popular at the time. Other major domestic competitions for men's football include the I-League second division in the Indian League System and the annual knock-out style Federation Cup. For women's football, there is the India women's football championship.

Other European top leagues, such as the UEFA Europa League, Germany's Bundesliga, Italy's Serie A, and France's Ligue 1 are broadcast on television in India.

The nation has hosted the 2017 FIFA U-17 World Cup; this was the first FIFA junior football world cup held in India. The matches were held from 6 to 28 October in arenas in New Delhi, Kolkata, Kochi, Navi Mumbai, Guwahati, and Margao.

The nation then hosted another FIFA junior football world cup, the 2022 FIFA U-17 Women's World Cup. The matches were held from 11 to 30 October in arenas in Navi Mumbai, Margao and Bhubaneswar.

In club football, a rivalry between Mohun Bagan and East Bengal FC of West Bengal known as the Kolkata Derby attracts many viewers, generating interest in fans. As of 2021, in ISL teams, 25% of players were from the states of Mizoram and Manipur in Northeast India. Most of the players of the India national football team are from these northeast states, where there are football clubs such as Aizawl FC, Shillong Lajong FC, and Neroca FC, who all play in the Indian Football League.

=== Golf ===
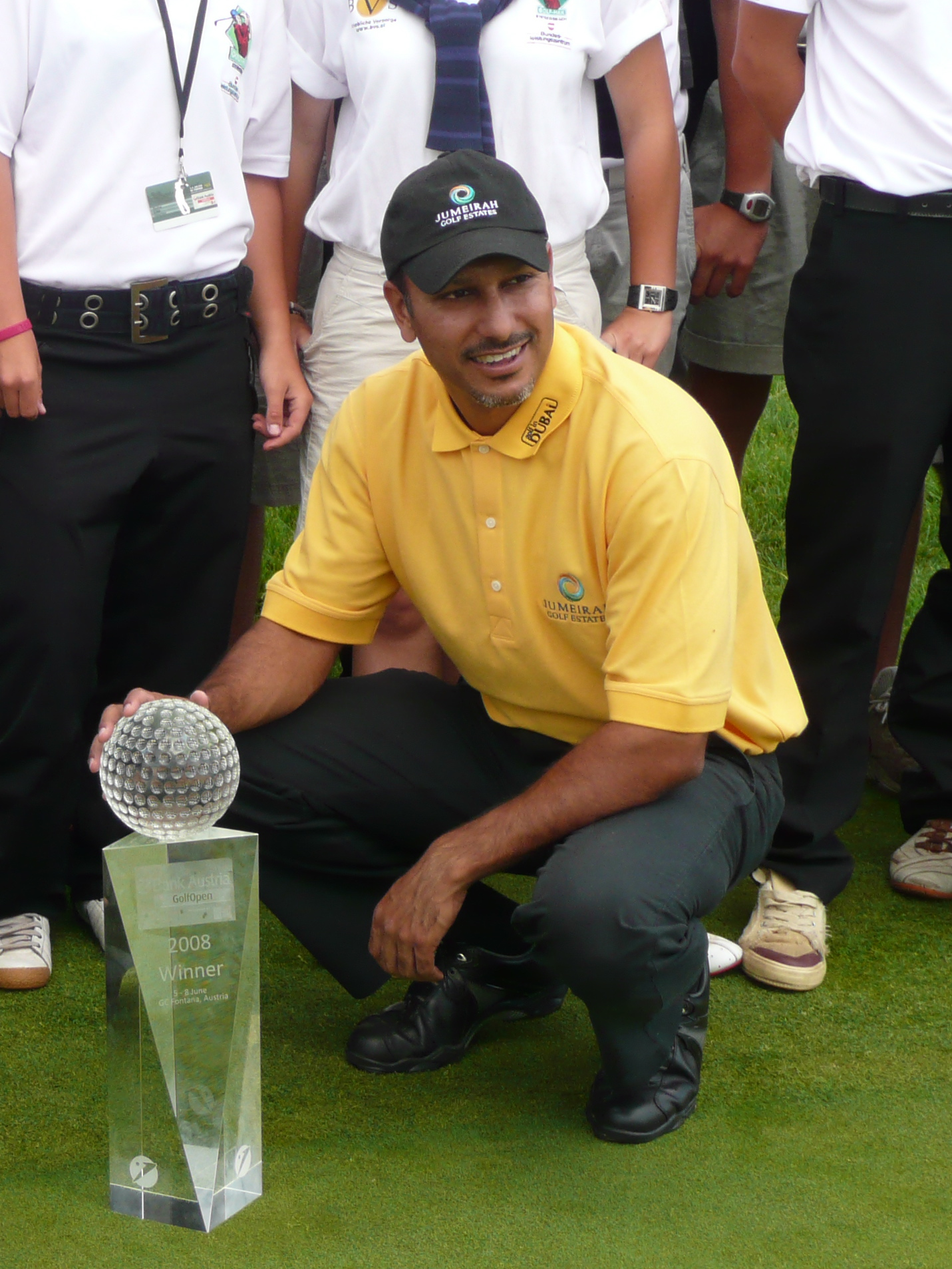
Jeev Milkha Singh at the 2008 PGA

Golf is played among the wealthier classes. The most successful Indian golfers are Jeev Milkha Singh and Anirban Lahiri. Singh won three titles on the European Tour, four on the Japan Golf Tour, and six on the Asian Tour. His highest world ranking was on 28 March 2009. Singh has won the Asian Tour Order of Merit twice. Meanwhile, Lahiri has two European Tour wins and seven Asian Tour wins, qualifying for the 2015 Presidents Cup.

Other Indians who have won the Asian Tour Order of Merit are Jyoti Randhawa in 2002 (the first Indian to do so), and Arjun Atwal, who went on in 2010 to become the first Indian-born player to become a member of the US-based PGA Tour and win the 2010 Wyndham Championship.

In golf at the Asian Games, the India's men's golf team won gold at the 1982 Asian Games and silver at the 2006 Asian Games. Lakshman Singh won the individual gold at the 1982 Asian Games.

There are numerous golf courses around India as well as a Professional Golf Tour. The main tournament is the Hero Indian Open, co-sanctioned by the Asian Tour and European Tour.

At the Tokyo 2020 Olympics, Aditi Ashok finished fourth place in the women's golf competition.

=== Gymnastics ===
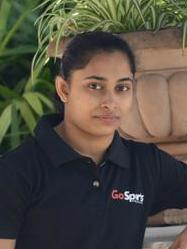
Dipa Karmakar is India's first gymnast, who participated in the Olympics and finished in fourth place at the Rio Olympics on her Olympic debut.

In India, gymnastics is not as prominent due to the lack of facilities, exposure, encouragement, championships, sponsorships, and coaching. However, the sport gained national attention after the performance of Dipa Karmakar at the 2016 Summer Olympics in Rio de Janeiro, where she reached fourth place in the final round during her debut. Karmakar's success made her well known in India and encouraged new girls and boys to participate in gymnastics.

The Gymnastics Federation of India is the official governing body for gymnastics sport in India. It organises various tournaments throughout the year, and it is recognised by the Ministry of Youth Affairs and Sports of India.

Ashish Kumar won the first medal in gymnastics for India, which was bronze at the 2010 Commonwealth Games. He also won a silver medal in the men's vault in that edition.

At the 2014 Commonwealth Games in Glasgow, Karmakar won bronze in the women's vault final. Her second vault, the Produnova vault—known as the vault of death due to how dangerous it could be—was executed with a score of 15.1 (D-7, Ex- 8.1). With this attempt, she became the fifth gymnast to ever execute the Produnova just after gymnast Oksana Chusovitina. In October 2015, Karmakar became the first Indian gymnast to qualify for a final stage at the World Artistic Gymnastics Championships. In 2016, when she qualified for the Rio Olympics, she became the first Indian gymnast to do so. Hours after her qualification at the 2016 Gymnastics Olympic Test Event, she won a gold medal in the women's vault event. On 6 July 2016, FIG honored Dipa by naming her World Class Gymnast. At the Rio Olympics, she achieved fourth place in vaults. After a long hiatus from injury, she ran for vaults and won gold at the World Challenge Cup series.

=== Tennis ===
Vijay Amritraj and Leander Paes

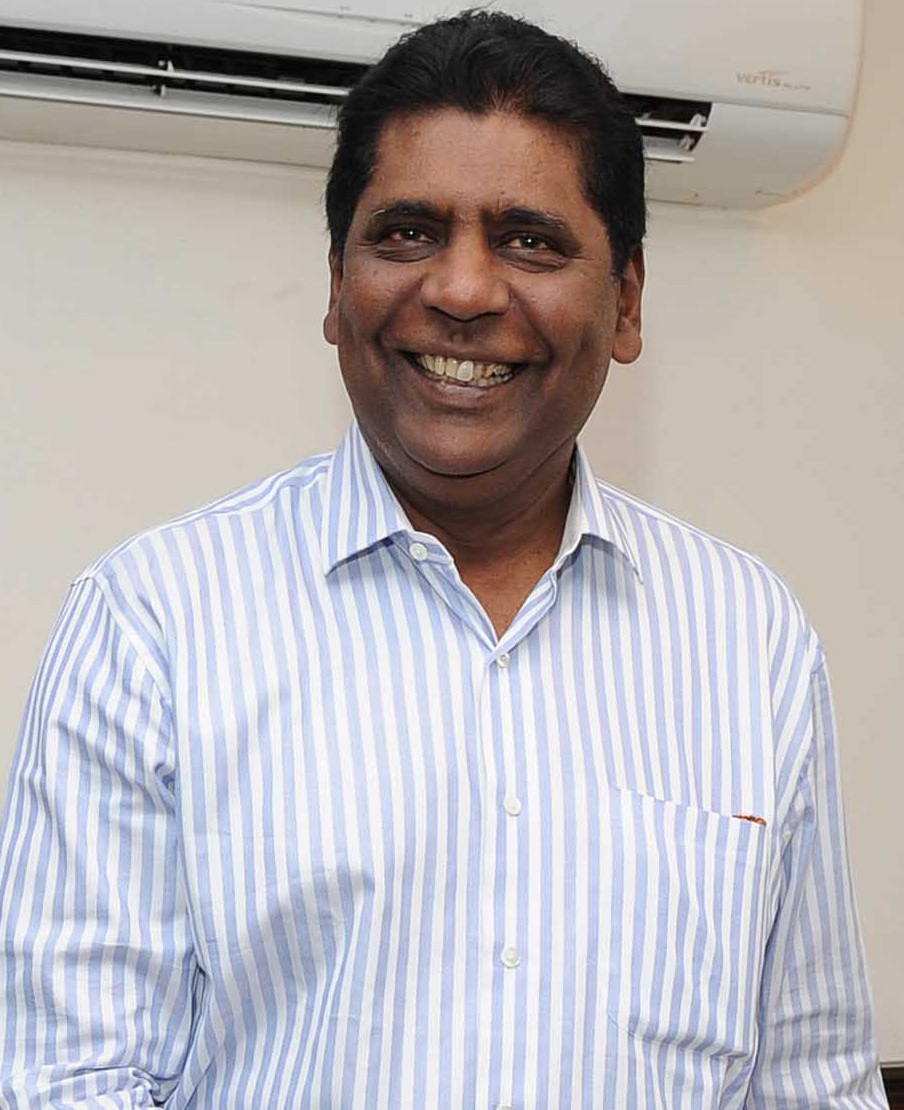
First professional tennis player of India, Vijay Amritraj, he was a quality singles player and reached QF of the Wimbledon Championships

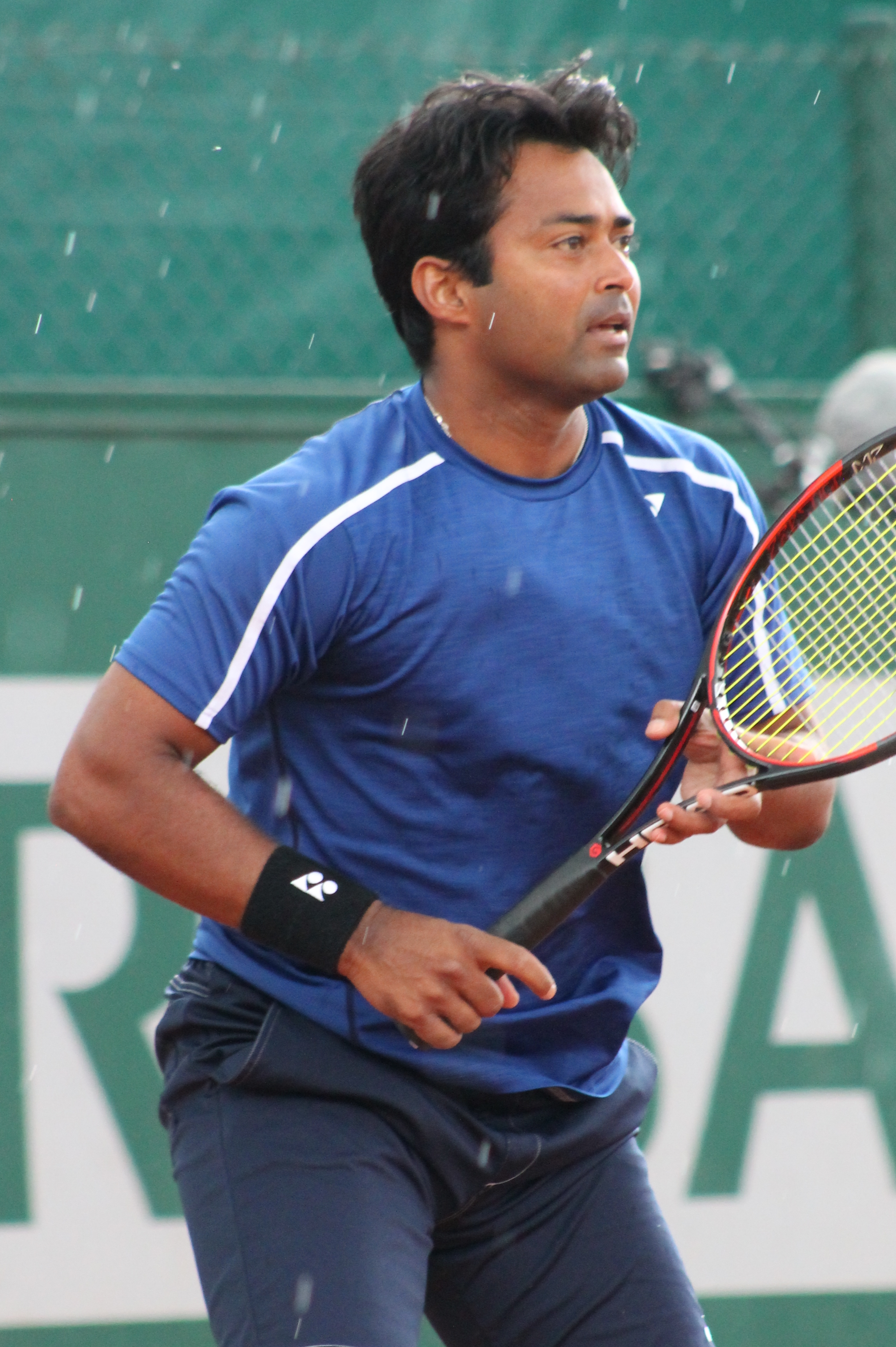
Leander Paes, 1996 Olympics' bronze medalist, multiple mixed doubles grand slams winner.

Legendary tennis players of India

Tennis, in urban areas, is a popular sport among Indians after the success of Vijay Amritraj. He was India's first singles player who reached the quarterfinals of the Wimbledon Championships. Amritraj was a notable player in the 1960s and 1970s. He is the first Indian singles tennis player who was in the top 50 of the WTA rankings and was the number 16 world singles player.

The All India Tennis Association, is the national governing body for tennis in India. It is affiliated with the International Tennis Federation (ITF), the governing body for tennis in the world. The ATP 250 Maharashtra Open was organised in Pune until 2022. (Note: Maharashtra Open is the only ATP 250 level tournament in South Asia. It is the only international level tennis championship in India. Players such as Rafael Nadal and Stan Wawrinka have participated and won.) Stan Wawrinka was its most successful player, while Rafael Nadal participated in it.

In Grand Slams, India has won multiple Tennis Grand Slams in men's doubles and mixed doubles. Leander Paes won a singles bronze medal at the 1996 Olympics, achieving the world record for the number of mixed doubles in Wimbledon. Since the late 1990s, Paes and Mahesh Bhupathi have won many men's doubles and mixed doubles Grand Slam titles. Sania Mirza was an Indian woman tennis player who won a WTA title, was in the Top 30 WTA rankings, and won three Grand Slam doubles events, the first at Wimbledon in 2015. In singles, Yuki Bhambri is a top player at the ATP Tour; Bhambri was the Australian Open junior singles champion in 2009. Women tennis players Ankita Raina and Karman Kaur Thandi were in the top 200 in 2018.

=== Shooting ===
The National Rifle Association of India (NRAI) was founded in 1951 with a view to promote and popularize the shooting sports in India. It is the governing body for shooting sports in the country. India has won many international medals in various forms of this sport.

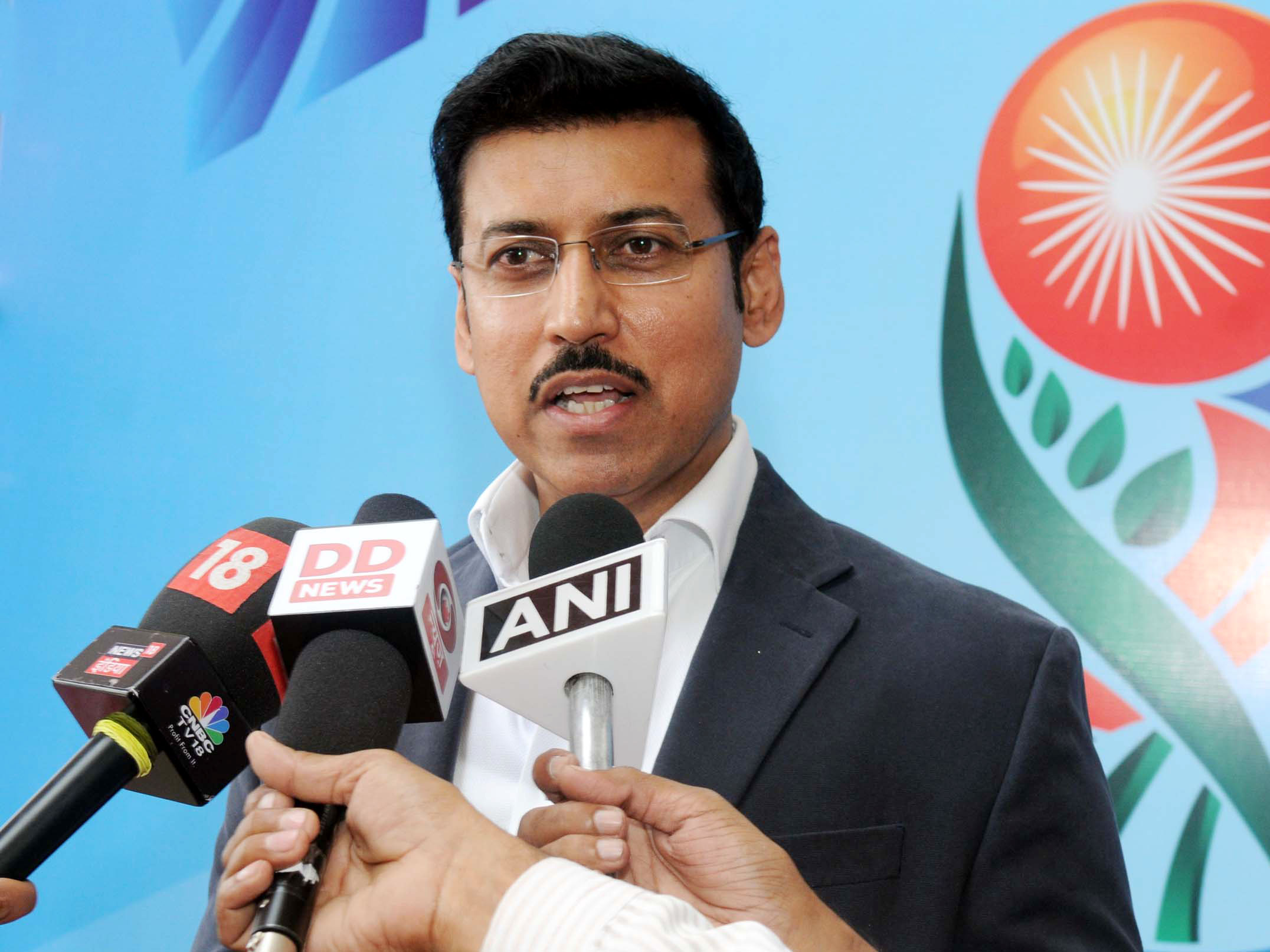
Rajyavardhan Singh Rathore, a former rifle shooter, won a silver medal, the first Olympic medal in shooting.

Rajyavardhan Singh Rathore won the first Olympic medal in shooting for India. Rathore won silver in the 2004 Summer Olympics in double trap and has won 3 Commonwealth gold medals, one silver medal, and a silver and bronze medal in the Asian Games.

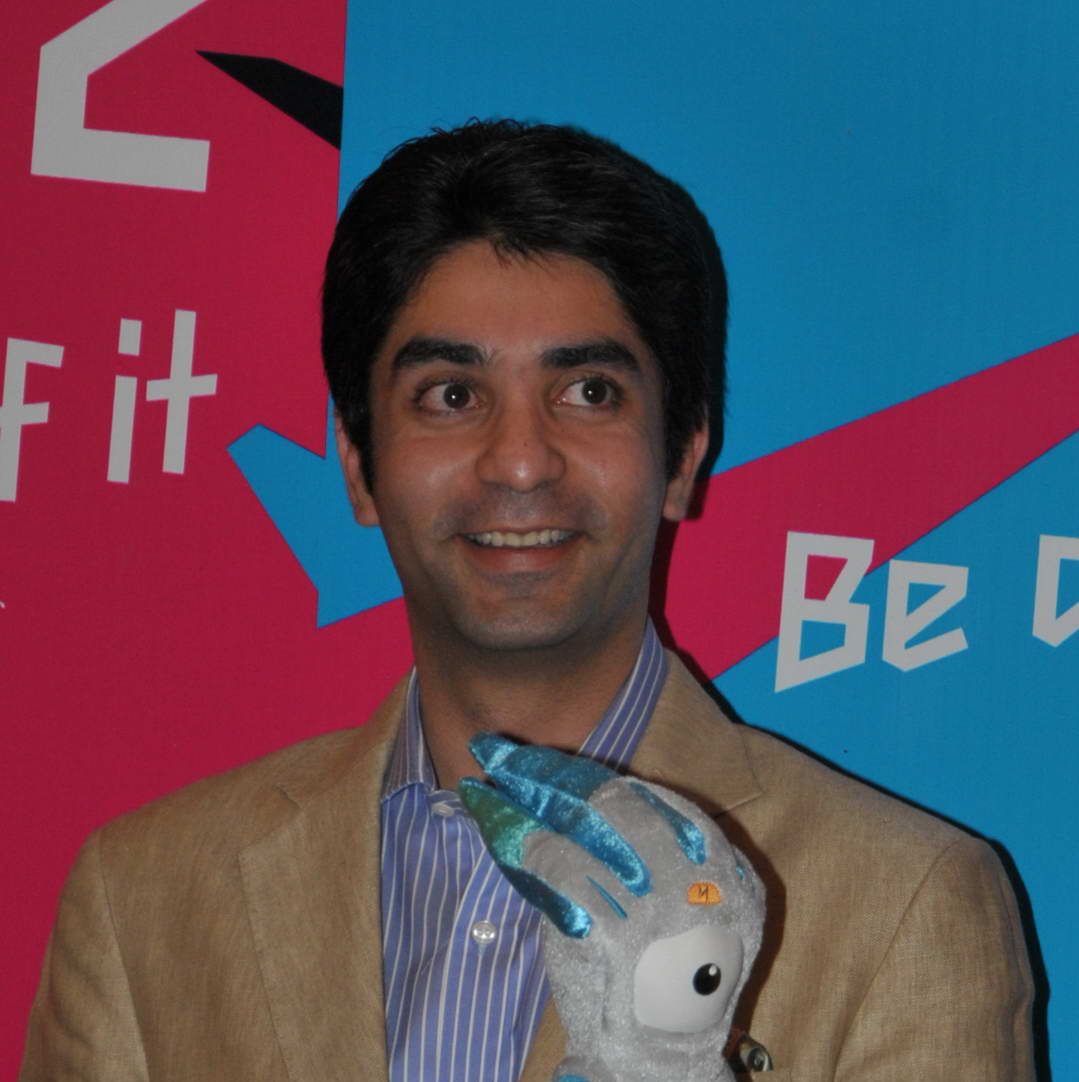
Abhinav Bindra, former air rifle shooter, won a gold medal in the 10m air rifle shooting event at the 2008 Beijing Olympics.

Abhinav Bindra won the first Olympic gold medal in shooting at the 2008 Beijing Olympics. It was the first individual Olympic gold medal by an Indian in Olympics.

Gagan Narang won a bronze medal at the 2012 Summer Olympics in the 10 meter air rifle shooting event. He won four gold medals in the 2006 Commonwealth Games in Melbourne; among these two he won with Abhinav Bindra in team event.

=== Weightlifting ===
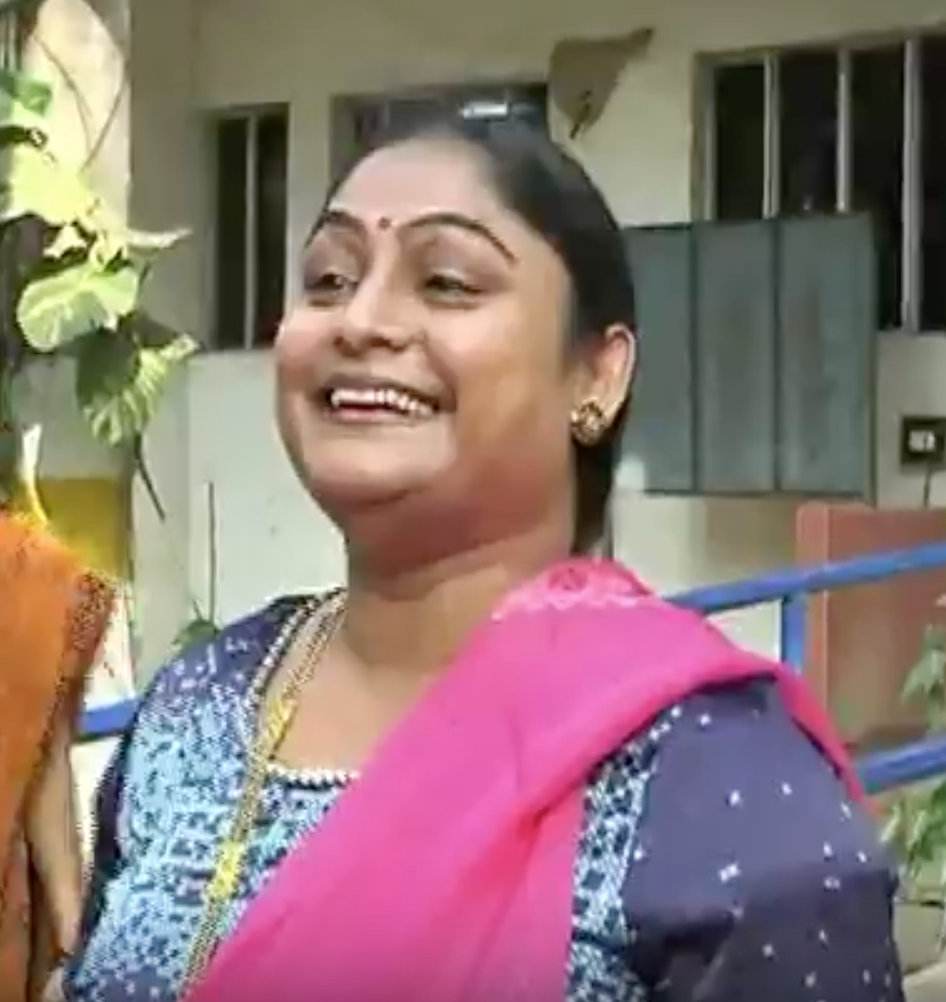
Karnam Malleswari, Indian former weightlifter. She won first ever Olympic medal in Weightlifting for India, also is the first Indian woman who won an Olympic medal

Karnam Malleswari won a bronze medal at the 2000 Summer Olympics in Sydney, making her the first Indian woman to win an Olympic medal. The headquarters of the Indian Weightlifting Federation is in New Delhi. The federation is affiliated with the Indian Olympic Association (Delhi), and is also a member of the Asian Weightlifting Federation (Tehran) and International Weightlifting Federation (IWF, Budapest).

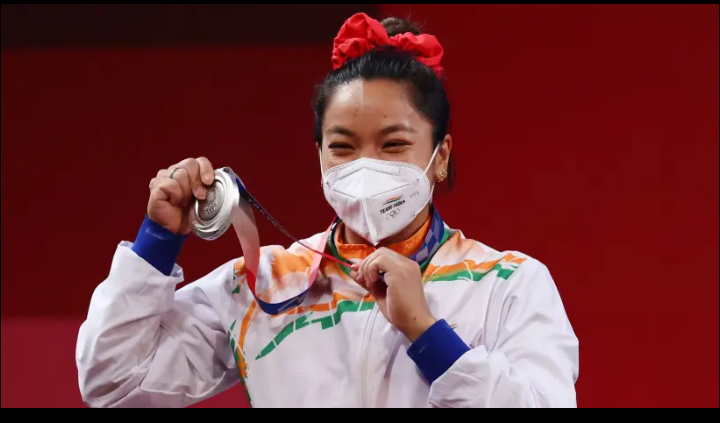
Saikhom Mirabai Chanu, an Indian weightlifter, won silver at the 2020 Summer Olympics.

In 2021, Saikhom Mirabai Chanu won silver medal in 49 kg category in 2020 Summer Olympics held in Tokyo, Japan. In 2022, she won Gold in weightlifting at Birmingham Commonwealth games.

=== Wrestling ===
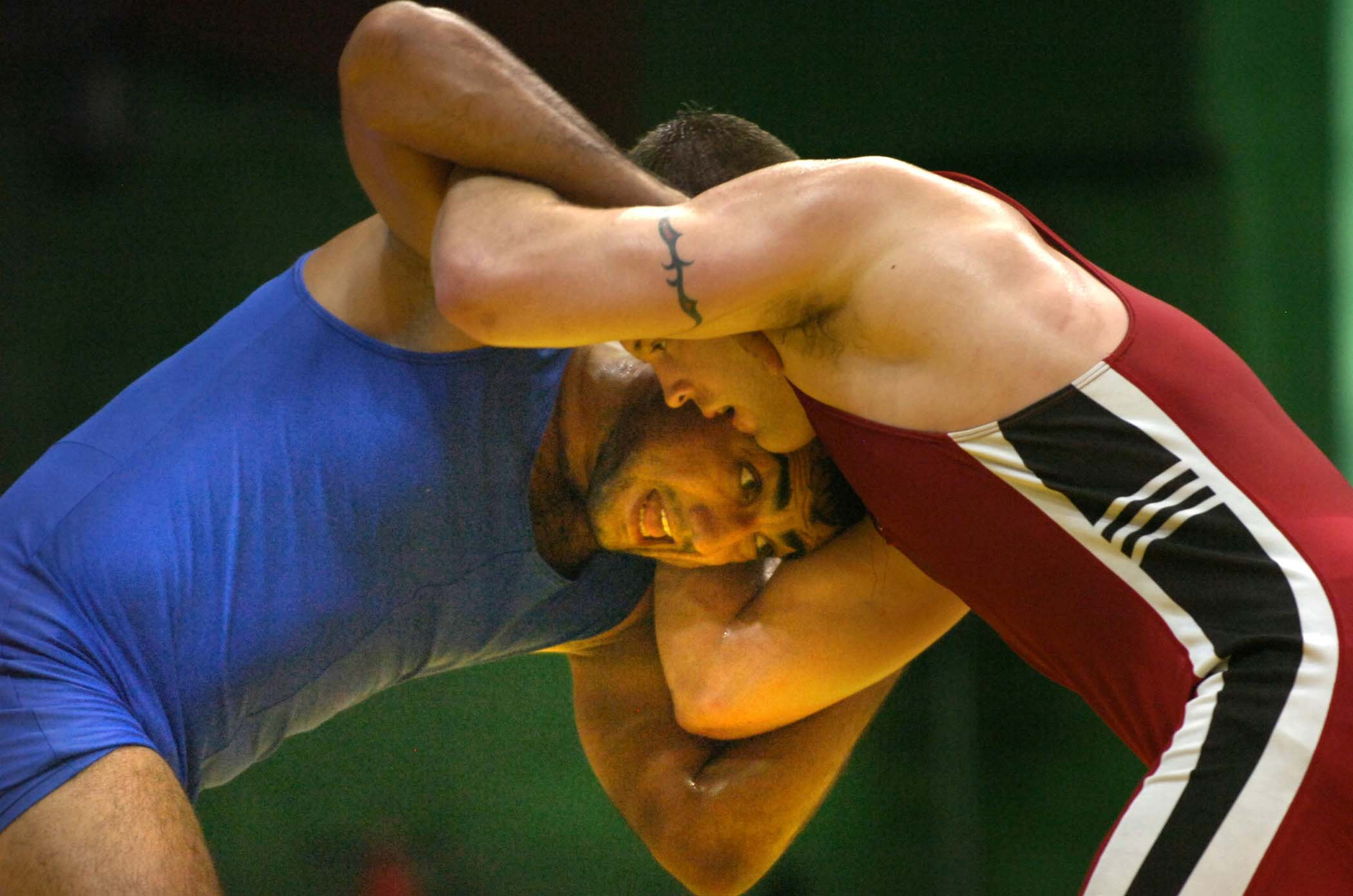
Military World Games in Hyderabad, India.

Wrestling is a sport in India, going back to ancient times. The sport of wrestling began in India several centuries ago, during the Middle Ages. Wrestling is among the most prestigious and oldest events in the Olympic Games. It was included in the Olympics in 708 BC. In ancient times, wrestling in India was mainly used as a way to stay physically fit. It was also used as a military exercise without any weapons. Wrestling in India is also known as dangal, and it is the basic form of a wrestling tournament.

=== Table Tennis ===
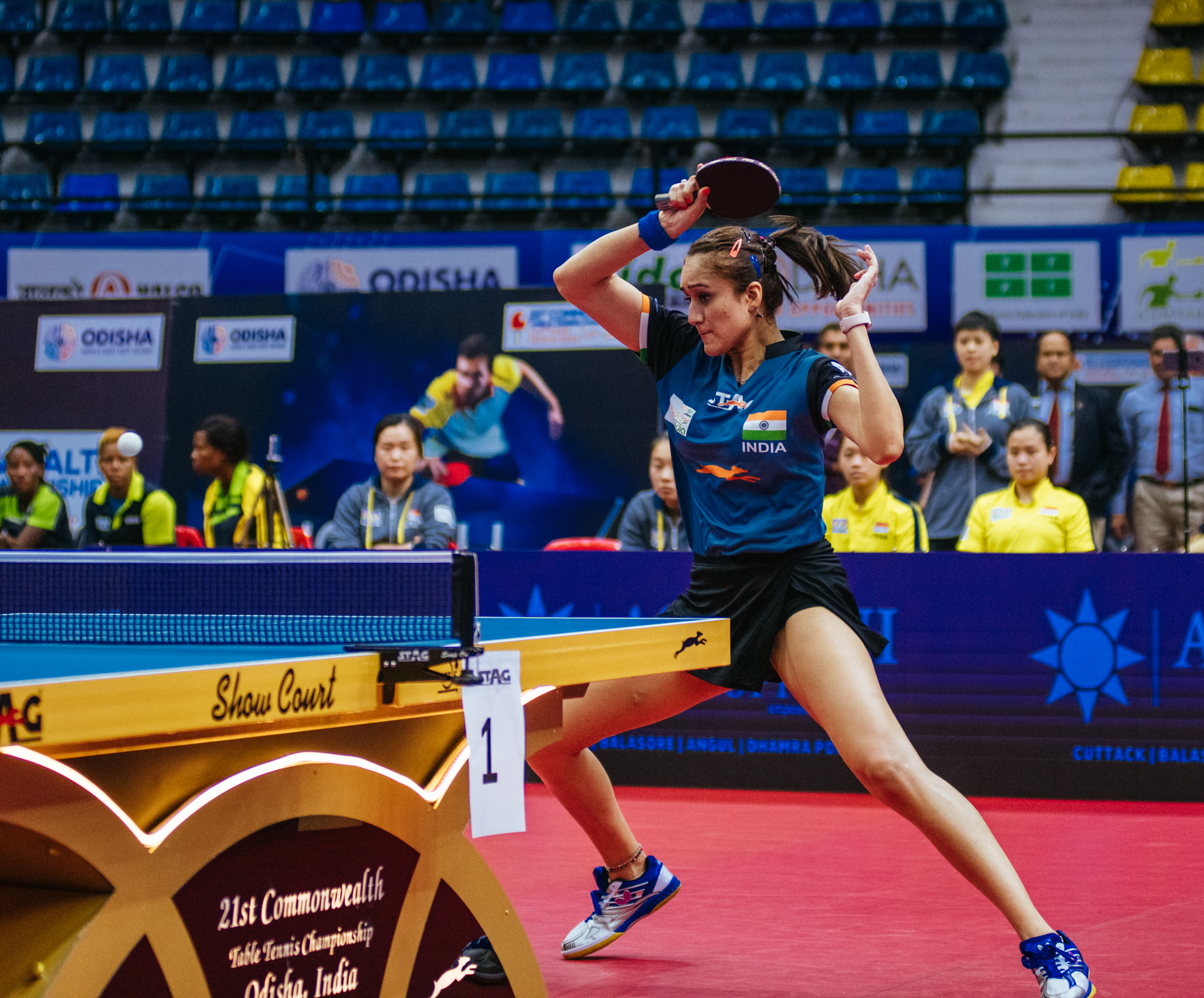
Manika Batra at 2019 Commonwealth Table Tennis championships

Table tennis is a popular indoor recreation sport in India, which has caught on in states including West Bengal and Tamil Nadu. The Table Tennis Federation of India is the official governing body of the sport. India, which is ranked 30th in the world, has produced a single player ranked in the top 50, Sharath Kamal.

=== Aquatics ===
The Swimming Federation of India is the national governing body for aquatic sports in India. Legally, it is a non-profit association registered under the West Bengal Societies Registration Act, 1861. The Federation holds elections for its office bearers every four years. The SFI currently oversees competition in the sports of swimming, masters swimming, synchronized swimming, diving, high diving, and water polo. It is affiliated to FINA and Asia Aquatics.

Sajan Prakash and Srihari Natraj became the first-ever Indian swimmers to qualify for the Olympic Games (2020 Olympics) by breaching the A standard time.

=== Basketball ===
People in urban India follow the sport, probably played in almost every urban private school, although very few people follow it professionally. In rural India nearly all the people are not aware of it. India has both men's and women's national basketball teams. Both teams have hired head coaches who have worked extensively with NBA players and now aim to popularise the game in India. Satnam Singh Bhamara officially marks the first player from India to be selected in the NBA by being drafted by the Dallas Mavericks as the 52nd pick of the 2015 NBA draft, as well as the first player to be drafted straight out of high school as a postgraduate.

The Young Cagers, as the national team is nicknamed, made one Olympic appearance in basketball and appeared 20 times in the Asian Championship. India is currently ranked 58th in the world in basketball. The India national team had its best result at the 1975 Asian Championship, when the team finished ahead of teams including the Philippines, one of Asia's basketball strongholds. Internationally, one of the most recognised Indian basketball players has been Sozhasingarayer Robinson. The Basketball Federation of India (BFI) is the governing body for basketball in India. Affiliated to the International Basketball Federation (FIBA) since 1936, India has one of Asia's longest basketball traditions.

India's women had their best result at the 2011 FIBA Asia Championship for Women when they finished sixth. The team has several internationally known players including Geethu Anna Jose, who was invited to tryouts for the WNBA in 2011.

Sports18 air NBA in the nation and DD Sports air its old game highlights. Indian National Basketball League also operates in India.

=== Volleyball ===
Volleyball is a recreation sport played in India. India is ranked fifth in Asia, and 27th in the world. In the youth and junior levels, India came in second in the 2003 World Youth Championships. The Indian senior men's team is ranked 46th in the world. A major problem for the sport is the lack of sponsors.

=== Canoeing and Kayaking ===
India has won two bronze medals in canoeing at the Asian Games. The Indian Kayaking and Canoeing Association (IKCA) is the governing body for canoeing and kayaking in India.

"Bangalore Kayakers" or "Southern River Runners" are India's first amateur group of white water kayakers. Based out of Bangalore, they explore rivers around Western Ghats.

=== Cycling ===
The history of cycling in India dates back to 1938, and the Cycling Federation of India governs the sport. Though cycling is unknown as a professional sport in India, it is popular as a common recreational sport.

Mountain biking is becoming a popular sport in India. Uttarakhand tourism development annually organise Uttrakhand Himalayan MTB tournament in which 50 mountain bikers participate in 884 km long race, which runs for a week. It is Asia's longest mountain bike race, bikers around the world take part in this mountain race.

The Tour of Nilgiris is a major non-competitive and non-commercial touring event in South Asia that covers 1,000 kilometres in under 10 days.

=== Equestrian sports ===
India has a wide following in various equestrian sports, including show jumping, eventing, dressage, endurance riding and tent pegging. Supported by the Equestrian Federation of India, eventing is the most popular of the five, with teams representing the country at most Asian Games, winning a bronze medal in the 2002 and 2006 games. India has been represented at the Olympics twice, by Wing Commander I.J. Lamba, and Imtiaz Anees.

=== Judo ===
Judo is played by few in India. It is not widely known. The first written record about judo in India in Kodokan is about demonstrations and coaching of Judo by Shinzo Tagaki arranged at Shantiniketan in 1929 by Rabindranath Tagore. The Judo Federation of India was formed in 1965.

As of 31 October 2022, India have 11 commonwealth games medals in Judo. Indian Judoka Tulika Maan and Sushila Devi each won a silver Vijay Kumar Yadav won a Bronze in the 2022 Commonwealth Games.

=== Taekwondo ===
Taekwondo in India is administered by the India Taekwondo which was constituted in July 2019 consisting of a five-member ad hoc committee with Namdev Shirgaonkar as chairman with a mandate to carry out the election procedures within a stipulated time-frame. Surendra Bhandari won a bronze medal in taekwondo at the 2002 Asian Games. Taekwondo is not widely played in India. Bollywood actors Nitu Chandra, Akshay Kumar, Tiger Shroff, Ajay Devgn and Isha Koppikar have black belts in this sport.

Indian athlete performed well at 2019 South Asian Games, they won total six medals including 3 golds in Taekwondo event, Rudali Barua (over 73 kg), Jarnel Singh (under 74 kg) and Latika Bhandari (under 53 kg) won gold medals each, Ganjot won silver in 86 kg category. Some open events are also held.

=== Karate ===
Karate in India is administered by the Karate India Organisation. India's notable karate participants include Aniket Gupta, Deepika Dhiman, Sunil Rathee, Supriya Jatav, and Gaurva Sindhiya. The Commonwealth Karate Championship 2015 were held in Delhi, India.

=== Handball ===
The Handball Federation of India (HFI) manages handball in India. The HFI established Premier Handball League. Handball is played locally, not nationally. India's handball team was formed and began playing on 27 April 1989.

== Non-Olympic sports ==
=== Chess ===
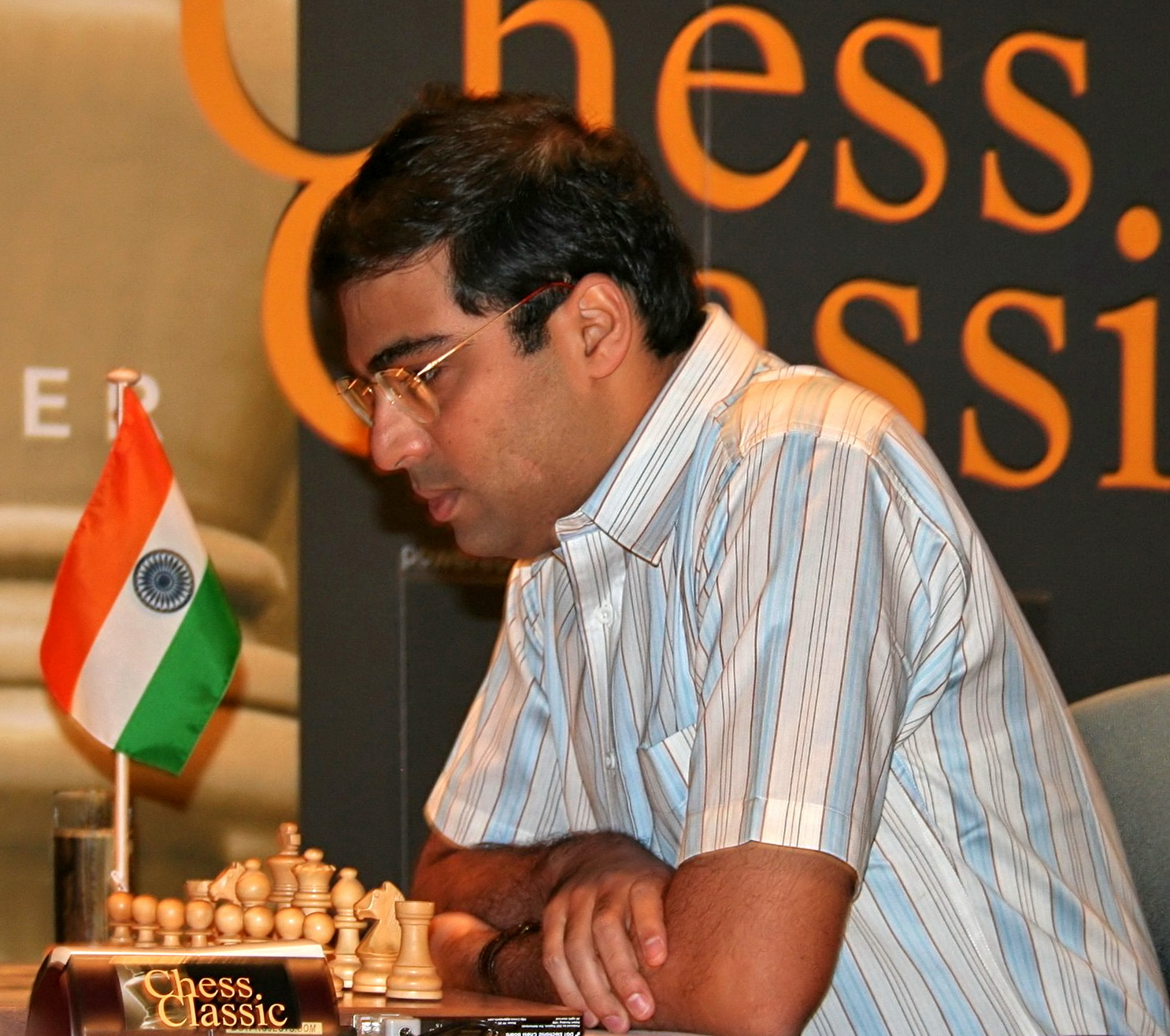
Viswanathan Anand, Grandmaster and three-time world champion

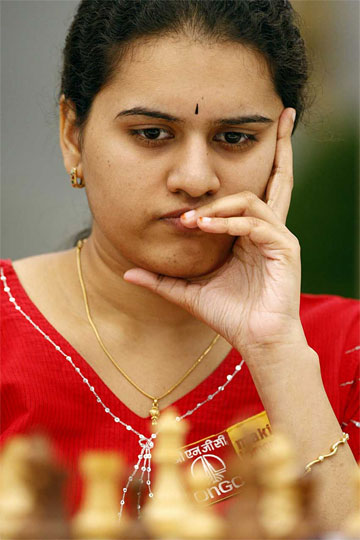
Koneru Humpy, world ranked number 3

The game is quite popular in Tamil Nadu, Calcutta many Grandmasters have been emerged from earlier region, former World Champion Viswanathan Anand is the most popular among them, he is first grandmaster from the country, first time he became World chess champion in 2007, also won it later twice. India is currently ranked World No. 2 in average rating of top 10 players, at 2710 narrowly behind the United States, and ahead of Russia, China, and Azerbaijan.

The Indian Chess Championship was held first in 1955, since 1971 it played annually. It is widely believed that the sport is originated in India. India's top players have included former World Champion Viswanathan Anand, current World Champion and 2024 Candidates winner Gukesh D, prodigies R. Praggnanandhaa and Arjun Erigaisi, and Pentala Harikrishna.

On 12 June 2023 Divya Deshmukh, the current national champion won gold medal at the Asian Continental Women's chess championship. As of 25 February 2022, India has 73 grandmasters and 7 players in top hundred in the world. As per All India Chess Federation, the national federation of the game, there are 50 thousand registered players and over one million play it in the country. Many Indian players have won tournaments internationally. Koneru Humpy is most prominent women player who holds rank 3 in the world. India has also won two Chess Olympiads in both men and women category.

=== Kabaddi ===
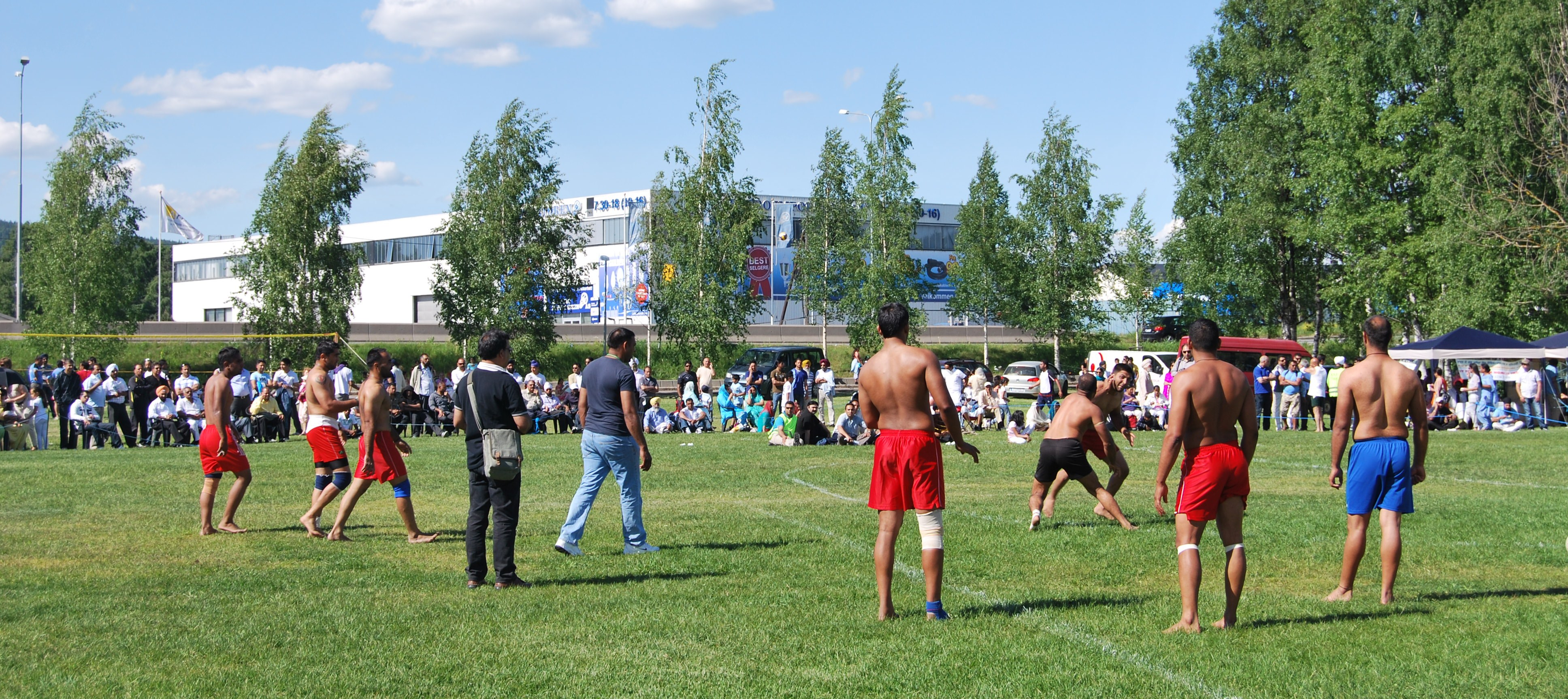
Kabaddi is one of the most popular sports in India

Kabaddi is an indigenous sport in India, that is traditionally played on rough grounds. The Pro Kabaddi League is a notable Kabaddi league in India. It is organised annually in various spots of the nation. Star Sports, Disney+ Hotstar airs it on TV and online respectively.

India has won gold in kabaddi in all Asian Games, excluding the 2018 Asian Games, where they won bronze. The four forms of kabaddi recognised by the Kabaddi Federation in India are Amar, Sanjeevni, Gaminee and Punjabi rules Kabaddi. India won the Kabaddi World Championship in 2007, beating Iran 29–19.

==== Lawn bowling ====
Lawn bowling, Bowls or Bowling is a new sport in India, and was not known to commoners, until Indian women's team won historic gold medal in this sport at 2022 Commonwealth Games in 'women's four event', by the team of Nayanmoni Saikia, Lovely Choubey, Rupa Rani Tirkey and Pinki Singh. They won against South Africa. Due to the win, the game came into the spotlight. Indians have also participated in the sport at the 2010 Commonwealth Games. Lawn bowling was included at the 2007 National Games in Guwahati, and the first bowling ground which is called the Green, was installed. India does not have many Greens, due to player often practice on hockey grounds. The next Green was installed in Ranchi, Jharkhand for 2011 National Games of India. Now New Delhi and Kerala also have Bowling Green, ground. In the country Jharkhand state is powerhouse in this sport, many players for India national team was selected from there. Jharkhand Bowling Association is the governing body for this sport in Jharkhand state. The Bowling Federation of India (BFI) is the governing body for bowling in India.

=== Polo ===
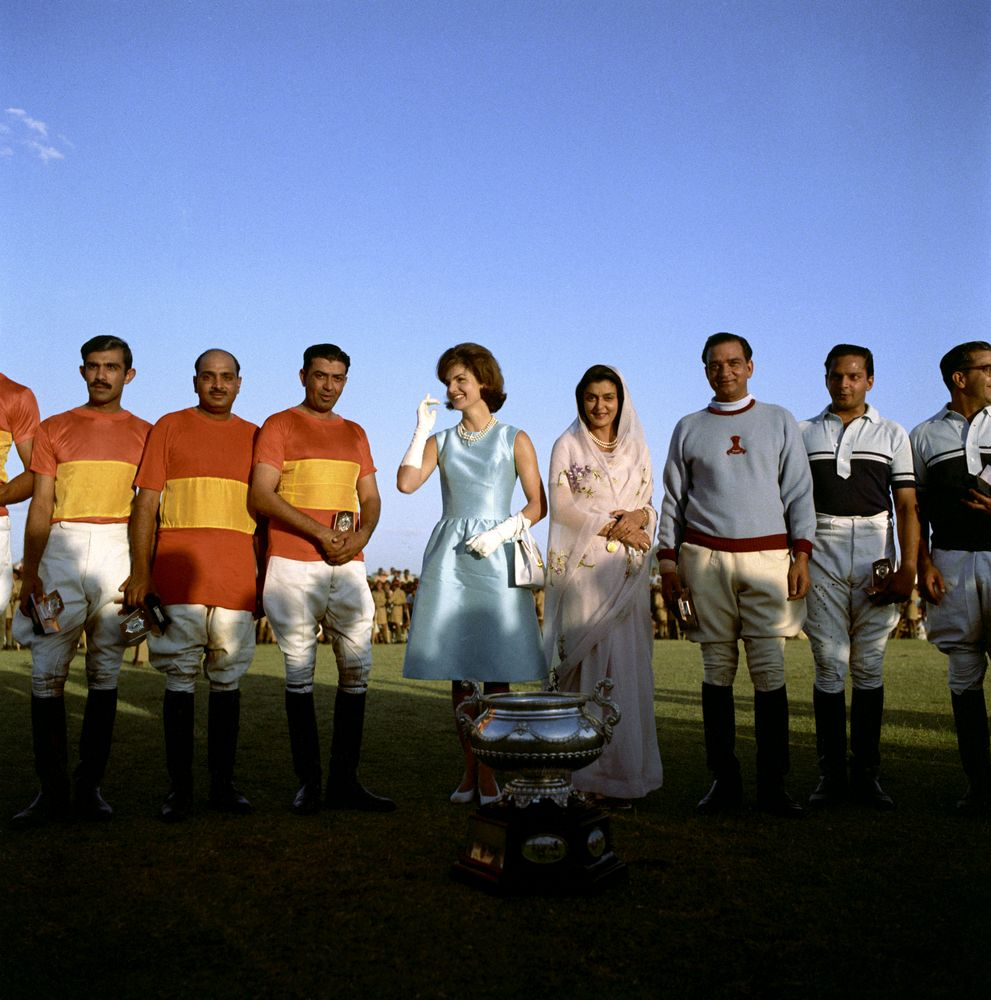
US First Lady Jacqueline Kennedy posing for a photograph during an annual Polo match in Rajasthan, known as the Sirmoor Cup in 1962.

India is the birthplace of modern polo. The modern game of polo is derived from Manipur, where the game was known as sagol kangjei, kanjai-bazee, or pulu. It was the anglicised form of the last, referring to the wooden ball that was used, which was adopted by the sport in its slow spread to the west.

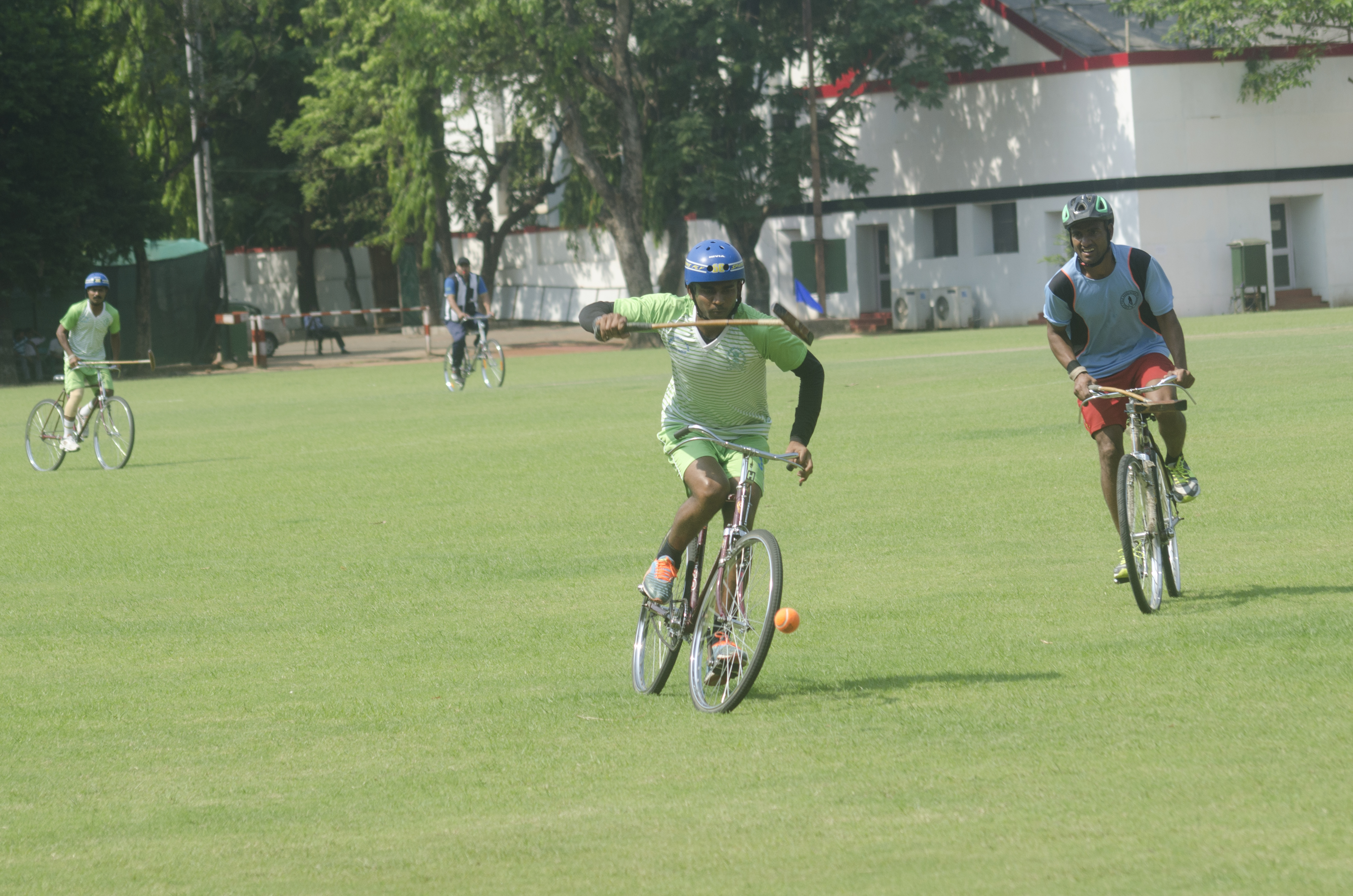
A traditional Cycle Polo game in CC&FC, Kolkata

=== Motorsports ===
Motorsport is a popular spectator sport in India, although there are relatively few competitors compared to other sports, due to the high costs of competing. Coimbatore is often referred to as the "Motor sports Capital of India" and the "Backyard of Indian Motorsports". S. Karivardhan, spearheaded motor racing, making Coimbatore the country's motor racing hub when he designed and built entry level race cars. Before Buddh International Circuit was constructed, the country's only two permanent race ways were the Kari Motor Speedway, Coimbatore and Madras Motor Racing Track, Chennai. MRF built the first Formula 3 car in 1997. MRF in collaboration with Maruti established the Formula Maruti racing, a single-seater, open-wheel class motorsport racing event for race cars made in India. MRF Challenge is a Formula 2000 open-wheel motorsport formula based series organised by Madras Motor Sports Club in association with MRF. Narain Karthikeyan and Karun Chandhok are the only drivers from to represent India in Formula 1.

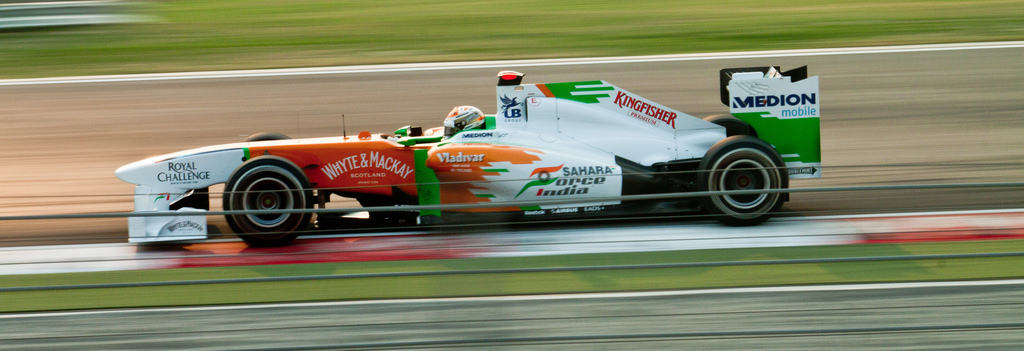
Force India drivers at the 2008 Canadian Grand Prix.

On 1 February 2005, Narain Karthikeyan became India's first Formula One racing driver. In March 2007, he also became the first-ever Indian-born driver to compete in a NASCAR Series. He debuted in the NASCAR Camping World Truck Series in the Kroger 250. Force India F1 was a Formula One motor racing team. The team was formed in October 2007, when a consortium led by Indian businessmen Vijay Mallya and Michiel Mol bought the Spyker F1 team for €88 million. After competing in 29 races without a point, Force India won their first Formula One World Championship points and podium place when Giancarlo Fisichella finished second in the 2009 Belgian Grand Prix. New Delhi hosted the Indian Grand Prix from 2011 to 2013 at Buddh International Circuit in Greater Noida, 50 km from New Delhi. Karun Chandhok was the test driver for Team Lotus & Narain Karthikeyan raced for HRT during the first half of the 2011 Formula One season. Karun Chandhok participated in Friday's practice session and Karthikeyan (stepping in for Daniel Ricciardo) raced at the 2011 Indian Grand Prix; it was the first time two Indian drivers associated with the same Formula One Grand Prix directly.

Mahindra Racing is an Indian constructor competing in the Formula E Championship since the inaugural season in 2014. Alexander Sims and Alex Lynn are the team's current drivers. The team formerly competed in MotoGP, fielding a team in the junior Moto3 (125cc) category between 2011 and 2015. Mahindra later refocused on being a bike and engine supplier, ultimately pulling out of the sport in 2017.

Team MRF's Gaurav Gill the first Indian rally driver to win FIA Asia-Pacific Rally Championship in 2013.

Jehan Daruvala drives under the Indian flag in the Formula 2 Championship. He currently races for MP Racing. Daruvala has three wins in the series so far.

=== Boat racing ===
Boat racings are popular in southern India. In Kerala many boat races are organised annually, champakulam moolam baot race, Kumarakom boat race, Payippad Jalotsavam, President's Trophy boat race, Aranmula boat race, Champions Boat League, Vallm kali, Nehru Trophy Boat Race are organised in July.

==== Powerboating ====
In March 2004 Mumbai hosted the first ever F1H2O (Formula 1 Powerboat) Grand Prix of India From 16 to 18 November 2018 Amaravati hosted the second F1H2O World championship Grand Prix of India. The event brought wide media attention especially after one of the team took the color and the name of Andhra Pradesh Capital, making it the first Indian branded team in the history of F1H2O. Team Amaravati led by Swedish drivers Jonas Anderson and Eric Edin. During Grand Prix of France held in Evian-les-Bains Jonas Anderson took the first place and Indian flag waved on the highest step of the podium. Since then many states are considering hosting Formula One Powerboat event considering the fact that no stadium is required to be built and the event is usually free for spectators.

=== E-sport and Gaming ===
Mobile gaming is very popular in India. As per analytics firm Sensor tower, by app downloads India is biggest gaming market in the world, as of March 2022, the country have 916 million installs, which is 19.2 percent of world games installed on smartphones. Fantasy gaming became a big thing, there are many fantasy gaming apps running in India. Due to rapid growth of gaming in the country, many foreign firms investing-partnering with Indian firms. PUBG was a popular game here. As of 27 Aug 2022, online gaming space is worth of US$290 million.

=== Mixed Martial Arts ===
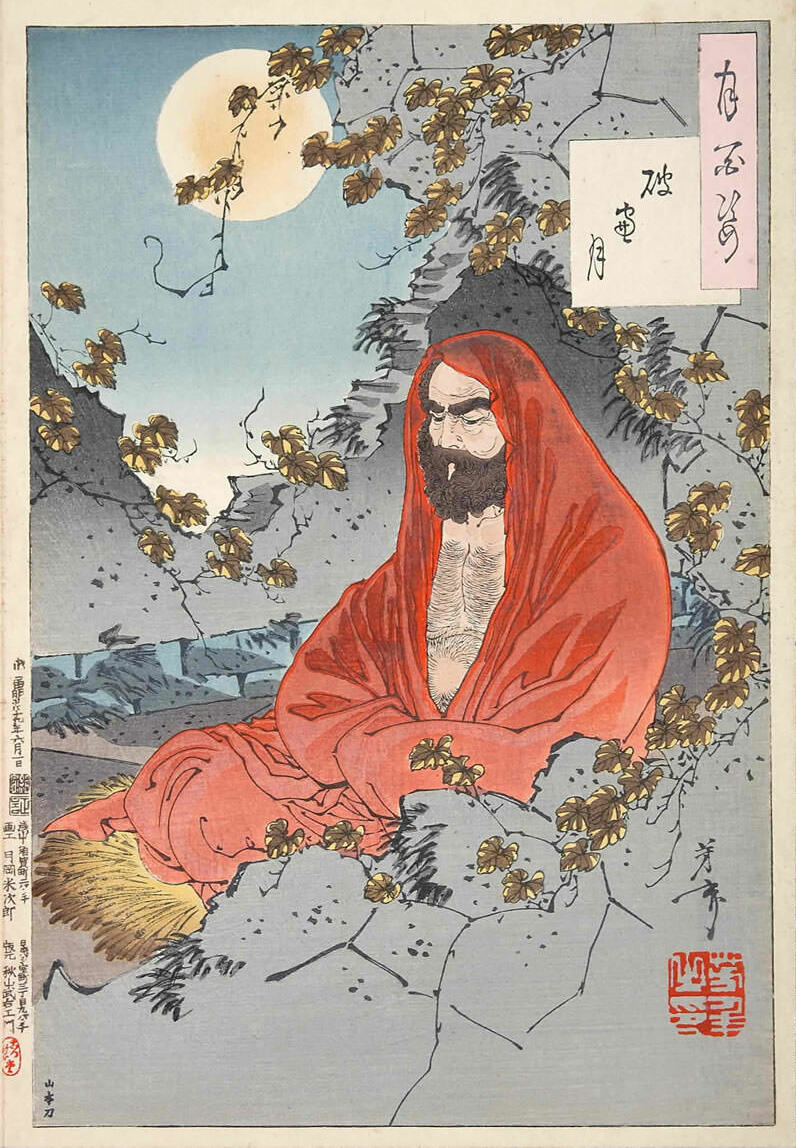
Bodhidharm's painting from 1887 by Japanese artist Tsukioka Yoshitoshi

According to Chinese legends, it is said that an Indian monk Bodhidharma, traveled to ancient China. He created Kung-fu martial art at Shaolin Temple and created Zen branch of Buddhism. He is regarded as a great monk in China.

Fan base for Mixed Martial Arts (MMA) are growing rapidly in India. Several international promotions are trying to build a strong presence in the country, with TV viewership rising. There are at least two organisation in India promote themselves as national Mixed Martial Arts (MMA) federation or promoter: Mixed Martial Arts Federation, India and All India Mixed Martial Arts Association.

Matrix Fight Night considered as biggest MMA promotion in India, it frequently organises live events across India. It was founded by Bollywood actor Tiger Shroff and operated by his mother Ayesha Shroff.

Bharat Khandare became the first fighter from India who signed to Ultimate Fighting Championship (UFC). UFC is the world's biggest MMA promotion. He debuted on 24 November 2017 against Song Yadong of China. UFC is a popular MMA promotion in this country. In 2023, Anshul Jubli won US tournament, Road to UFC and gained UFC contract. He defeated Jeka Saragih of Indonesia in the final of lightweight decision. As of 12 February 2023, Jubli is undefeated with 7 win winning streak.

=== Professional wrestling ===
Professional wrestling is a popular sport in India. Dara Singh was a notable pro wrestler from India, who won titles internationally. In the 1950s, he won world championship against Emile Czaja, popularly known by his ring name King Kong. He also defeated world champion wrestler Lou Thesz of USA Singh participated in almost 500 professional fights and remained undefeated in all of them, he wrestled against George Gordienko of Canada, John da Silva of New Zealand and others. In 2018, WWE honoured Dara Singh by inducting in WWE Hall of Fame Legacy. Tiger Joginder Singh, Arjan Singh Das was best professional wrestlers from India, who worked in promotions in Singapore, Japan, USA in the 1940s and 1950s.

Dalip Singh Rana, who is widely known by his ring name, The Great Khali was the WWE World heavyweight champion in 2007. On 7 April 2021, WWE honoured The Great Khali by inducting in the WWE Hall of Fame. Thus he became first professional wrestler from India who received this honour. (Note: The Great Khali has been inducted into WWE Hall of Fame (2021) also called as WWE Hall of Fame class of 2021.) Currently, wrestlers such as Saurav Gurjar, Rinku Singh and Shanky are in WWE. (Note: Source Gujjar, Rinku Singh perform in WWE under ring name Sanga and Veer Mahan respectively.) After WWE, Khali moved back to India and started a pro wrestling promotion, Continental Wrestling Entertainment (CWE), by which he provide training to the budding wrestlers and organise wrestling events. WWE has organised some live events in the India so far.

=== Sepak takraw ===
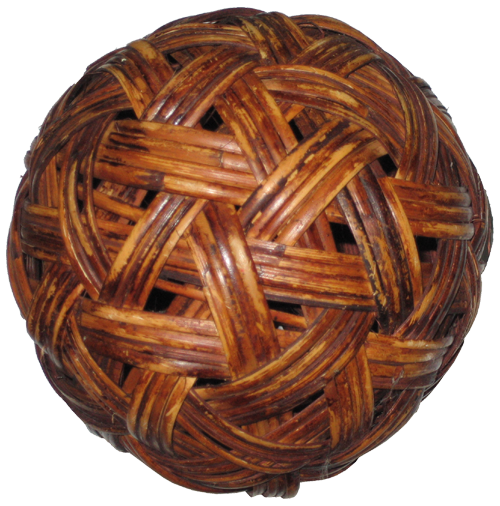
Sepak takraw ball

Sepak takraw, though not very well known in India, was a demonstration sport at the Delhi Asian Games in 1982. The Sepaktakraw Federation of India, with its headquarters in Nagpur, Maharashtra, was founded on 10 September 1982. It is recognised by the Indian Olympic Association and Ministry of Youth Affairs and Sports since 2000. So far, the federation has conducted 14 senior, seven junior, and six sub-junior national championships in different cities, and is conducting Federation Cup Tournaments and zonal National Championships.

The game is very popular in the northeastern state of Manipur, and some of the best players came from there. In the 22nd King's Cup International Sepak Takraw Tournament held in Bangkok, the India men's team lost in the semi-finals and claimed bronze in the team event. In the doubles event, the women's team lost in the semi-finals, but earned bronze medals.

On 21 August 2018, at the 2018 Asian Games, the national men's team won a bronze after losing 2–0 to Thailand. It was Indian's first medal in Sepak takraw in Asian games.

== Winter sports ==
Winter sports are common in India in the Himalayan areas. Skiing tournaments take place every winter in Gulmarg, and Manali. Winter sports are generally more common in the northern states and territories of Jammu and Kashmir, Himachal Pradesh, Uttarakhand, Sikkim, and Arunachal Pradesh. Skiing, snow rugby, snow cycling, and snow football are some of the common winter sports played in India. Skiing is more popular, although India has taken part in luge in Winter Olympics since 1998. Shiva Keshavan is the only Indian to have won medals in international meets in winter sports (Asian Gold 2011, Asian Silver 2009, Asian Bronze 2008, Asian Silver (doubles) 2005, Asian Bronze (singles) 2005), and to have participated in six Olympic Games. He is the Asian speed record holder at 134.4 km/h, making him the fastest man in Asia on ice. Luge is practised in a big way by the mountain residents in an improvised form called "reri".

=== Bandy ===
The Bandy Association of Indians governs bandy in India. Its headquarters are in Aurangabad. Bandy, a team winter sport played on an ice rink the size of a football field, in which skaters use sticks to direct a ball into the opposing team's goal, is generally played in northern India, where there is snow and ice. India is one of seven countries in Asia and out of a total of 27 to be a member of Federation of International Bandy. The national federation planned to send a team to the 2011 Asian Winter Games in Astana-Almaty, but ultimately did not. In July 2023, there was an Indian visit to Moscow and Krasnogorsk, including the national junior team practicing and playing matches on an ice hockey rink with large goal cages (the Czech invention "short bandy"). The 6th Annual national bandy championship is held in November 2024. In 2026 the Federation of International Bandy General Secretary visited India to discuss future cooperation and development opportunities.

=== Curling ===
In curling India is an emerging country. Its first ever international appearance was in 2022, when they took part in the World Mixed Curling Championship in Aberdeen, Scotland, recording three victories on the way.

=== Skiing ===
Skiing is a recreational activity that is popularly indulged in at many Himalayan Hill stations in India. Tourists enjoy skiing at places such as Manali, Jammu and Kashmir, Kasauli, Nainital, Shimla, hung in Sikkim, Tawang in Arunachal Pradesh, Manali, Kufri, Chamba, Narkanda in Himachal Pradesh, Pahalgam and Gulmarg in Jammu and Kashmir, Mundali, Munsiari, and Auli in Uttarakhand etc.

== Other sports and games ==
=== Sport Climbing ===
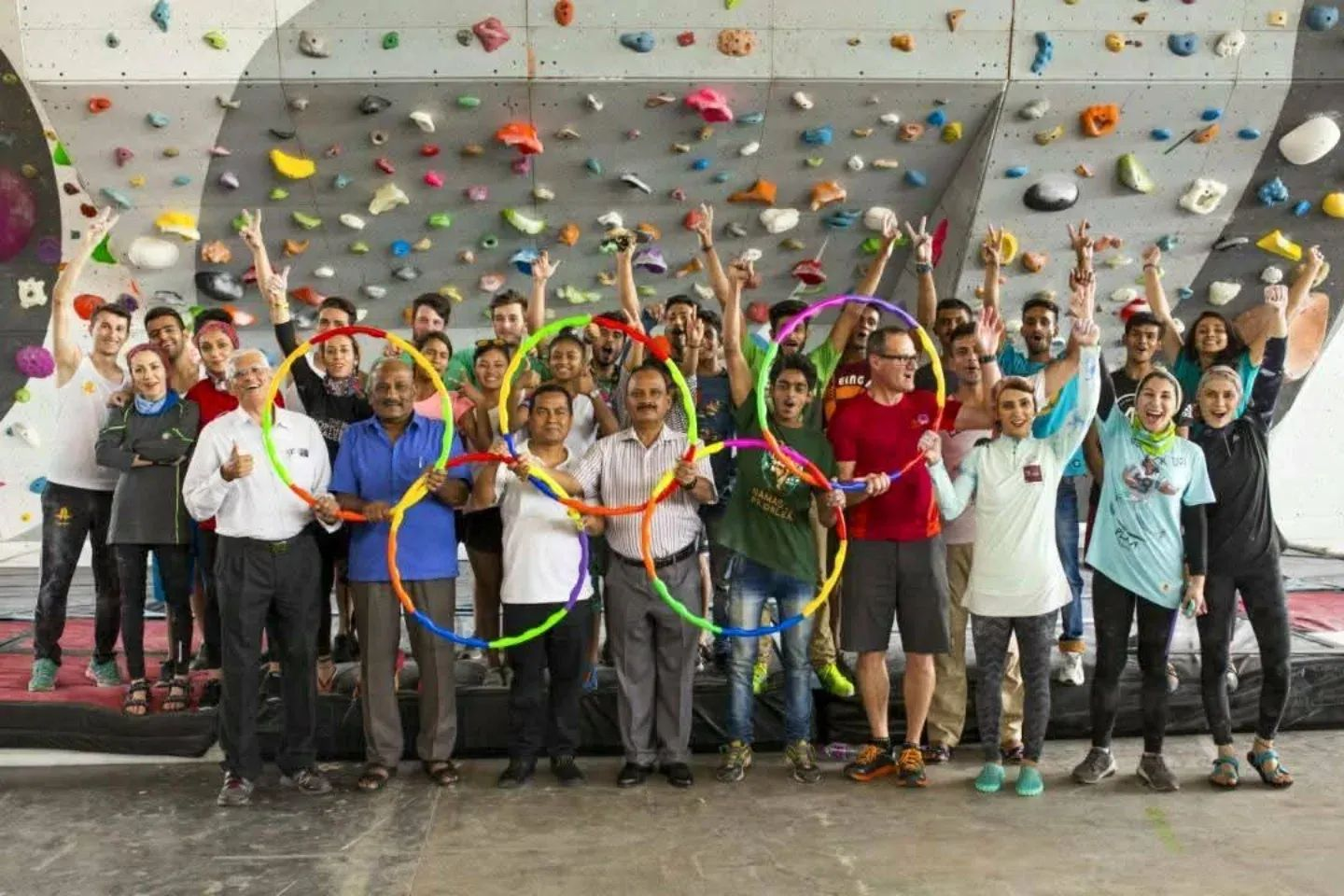
Brigadier M.P. Yadav, VSM, Senior Vice President of Sport Climbing Federation of India, with the Indian Sport Climbing Team and international climbers during a World Cup event in Navi Mumbai

Sport climbing was introduced in India in 1991. It is governed by the Indian Mountaineering Foundation (IMF).

=== Mountain climbing ===
Mountain climbing sport has a long history in India. Many climbers from India have climbed Mount Everest. Avtar Singh Cheema was the 1st Indian mountaineer who climbed Mount Everest in 1965, and in the same year, Captain MS Kohli also climbed it. Bachendri Pal is the first Indian woman mountaineer who climbed Mount Everest, she did this feat in 1984. In 1993, Santosh Yadav became the first woman of India who climbed it twice. In 2014, Malavath Purna became the youngest Indian mountaineer who climbed Everest. Love Raj Singh Dharmshaktu has gone up on it 7 times.

India has few government institute or schools that provide training in Mountaineering : Himalayan mountaineering institute of Darjeeling, Atal Bihari Vajpayee Institute of Mountaineering and Allied Sports (ABVIMAS) Manali, both are founded by then prime minister Jawaharlal Nehru in 1954 and 1961 respectively. ABVIMAS institute also provide training in other adventure sports such as skiing, aero-sport, water sport. (Note: Atal Bihari Vajpayee Institute of Mountaineering and Allied Sports, Manali was founded and previously known as 'Western Himalayan Mountaineering Institute'.)

=== Rock climbing ===
Rock climbing is popular among some enthusiasts of adventure sports. India has a lot of mountains; amateur and professional climbers often visit Miyar Valley of Himachal Pradesh, Shey Rock in Leh, and Sar Pass of Himachal Pradesh for rock climbing. Places such as Malshej Ghat in Maharashtra, Paithalmala in Kannur district of Kerala, Rajsangam, and Badami in Karnataka are popular rock climbing destinations. Bangalore has many climbing gyms which provide training. Ramnagara, Karnataka has a lots of rock and crags, as well as terrain features where people often do trekking and rock climbing. Spots such as Madapura Betta, Motherwall, Achalu, Senapathy, Ravugodlu, Karekallu, and Gethnaa Area crags are best for climbing. It is named after Gethnaa Government Institute for climbing.

=== Bouldering ===
Adventure sports enthusiasts do bouldering in Hampi of Karnataka. It is frequently visited by adventure seekers, because the place has infinite large boulders. It is known as a world class bouldering destination. Some bouldering spots have become well-known and frequently visited in the country. But the adventure sports do not have exposure, sponsorships, training facilities and coaching in the entire country.

=== Gambling, fantasy sports and betting ===
Gambling is illegal in most of the states except Goa, Mizoram, Sikkim, Nagaland states and Daman, where land based gambling and casinos are legal under the Public Gambling Act, 1976 of Indian Penal Code. Gambling is illegal in Maharashtra state, under the Bombay Prevention of Gambling Act 1887, but it is still widely played underground in various spots of Maharashtra state. Although there are laws against gambling in most of the states, gamblers still find a way to gamble throughout India. Many play the Seven Eight, Rummy, Teen patti, Seven on Seven, Blackjack, Bluff, Bridge, Mendikot, and Three to Five variants of Poker. These games are widely considered to be gambling. India has a plethora of online Fantasy gaming apps which the masses spend money to play. In these fantasy games, players make teams using mobile phones and get online WhatsApp ID. Often questions are raised that these fantasy online games are gambling, but these apps advertise themselves as being legal and not forms of gambling, but rather games of skills. Some states have banned these apps. Betting is illegal in India, but the nation does not have a proper law against online gambling. Many gambling platforms and mobile apps advertise themselves during the IPL, international, and domestic cricket matches on television through surrogate advertisements in India, Some of these apps are 1xBet, Fairplay, PariMatch, Betway and Wolf 777, with most of these websites and apps operating from outside of India. Betting on horse racing is legal, while matka gambling is illegal.

Lottery gambling is legal and allowed to be played in 13 states while the rest of the states have banned it, but lottery selling and buying happens in every state. Even in the states where it is banned, they do not have stringent laws and police do not enforce the existing laws. In some states such as Mizoram, Kerala, Nagaland and Sikkim, it is legal and hugely popular. 13 states that allows lotteries are: Kerala, Goa, Maharashtra, Madhya Pradesh, Punjab, West Bengal, Assam, Arunachal Pradesh, Meghalaya, Manipur, Sikkim, Nagaland and Mizoram. It was very popular in the states of Tamil Nadu and Karnataka, but now it is totally banned. In the states where it is banned, the ban is not effective and lotteries are conducted actively through apps and online websites.

Pranab Bradhan and Shibhnath Sarkar have won gold medals at the 2018 Asian Games in bridge game at Jakarta. This was the first time the game was played in such a major international event. Indians also won one silver and two bronze medals in Bridge at the Asian Games. The Bridge Federation of India (BFI) is the governing body for bridge game in India. BFI nominated Bradhan and Sarkar's names for the Arjuna Award in 2020.

=== Kho-kho ===
Kho kho is a tag sport played by teams of twelve players who try to avoid being touched by members of the opposing team, only nine players of the team enter the field. It is one of the two most popular traditional tag games played in schools, the other being kabaddi. Kho Kho Federation of India oversees the sports in the country. In 2022, the first season of Ultimate Kho Kho, a domestic franchise Kho-kho competition, took place in India.

=== Lagori ===
Lagori is played by children of all ages throughout India. In this there are usually 12 players, 6 in each time. A ball and 9 flat rocks are need to play this game. The rocks are piled in the center on top of each other from the largest to the smallest flat rock. Then both the teams alternatively hit that pile by a ball. The team which hits the pile first and manages topple the pile of rocks gets the chance to hold the ball and hit the player of opposite team with that ball. The task of the opposite team is to re-arrange the pile of rock without getting hit by the ball. Whichever players get hit by the ball is out and the task is taken further by remaining player of his team. If the team with the ball succeeds to out all the players before they could re-arrange the pile they win. If the team manages to re-arrange the pile then the team with the ball loses.

=== Kancha ===
Kancha is played by using marbles. Marbles are glass balls which are very popular among children. It is popular in small Indian cities and villages, among small children only as a gully sport. The participant has to hit the marble kept in a circle. If he hits the target properly, he wins. The winner gets the kancha of the other participant boys.

=== Gilli-danda ===
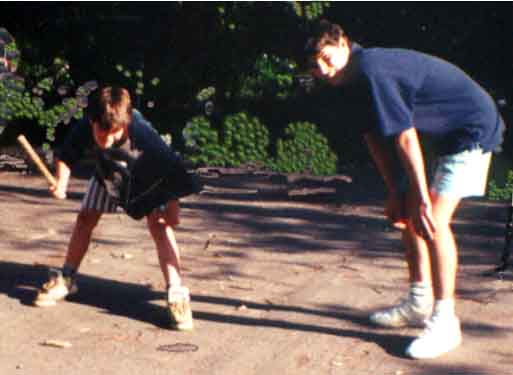
Kids playing this game

Gilli-danda, Karra billa or Viti Dandu in Marathi is a game played by using one small stick (gilli) and a large stick (danda) like cricket, with the ball replaced by gilli. It is still played in villages of Andhra Pradesh, Karnataka, Kerala (kuttiyum kolum - കുറ്റിയും കോലും), Tamil Nadu, Rajasthan, Uttar Pradesh, Madhya Pradesh, Bihar, Punjab, Maharashtra and Gujarat in India only as a recreational game among children.

=== Arm wrestling ===
Arm wrestling (also known as panja) is a popular pastime in India, and is played professionally in India in the Pro Panja League.

=== Animal events ===
==== Pola race ====
The Pola race is a traditional bull racing event held in rural Maharashtra. It is organized annually as part of the Pola festival, a day of thanksgiving for cattle. During the race, bull owners typically run alongside their animals over a set distance of approximately 100 to 150 metres. Due to animal welfare concerns, the Government of Maharashtra banned the practice in August 2017 and reaffirmed the ban on 6 September 2021.

==== Bullock cart race ====
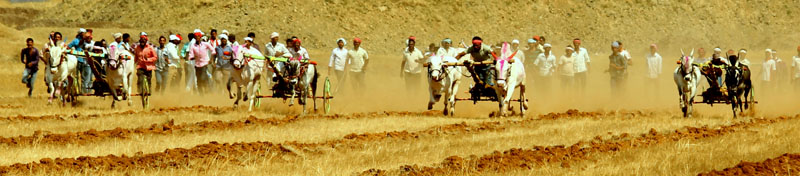

Bullock cart racing is a traditional rural sport organized by villagers in Maharashtra. In 2017, the Bombay High Court passed an interim order restraining the Maharashtra government from granting permission for these races anywhere in the state. Similar bullock cart races are also organized in the states of Karnataka and Tamil Nadu. People for the Ethical Treatment of Animals (PETA) and other activists have filed petitions opposing these events.

==== Buffalo fights ====
Buffalo fights are organized annually in parts of the country during rural festivals. In the state of Assam, these events are held during Magh Bihu (also known as Bhogali Bihu). Critics argue that these fights constitute cruelty to animals, as the animals suffer, are fatally injured, or die during the events. Consequently, petitions have been filed in court against the practice. In 2014, the Supreme Court of India banned all forms of animal fights and races, instructing the Animal Welfare Board of India (AWBI) and state governments to prevent the infliction of unnecessary pain and suffering on animals. Despite this, illegal fights continue to be organized in India. In Shahapur and Bhopal, Madhya Pradesh, buffalo fights are still held annually. "It is sad that these animals are made to suffer in the name of entertainment," stated PETA India campaign coordinator Sachin Bangera. Many buffalo bulls die in these illegal matches. Buffalo fights are also reported in villages within the Purulia district of West Bengal, as well as in the Padarahi and Rampur villages of the Muzaffarpur district in Bihar.

==== Jallikattu ====
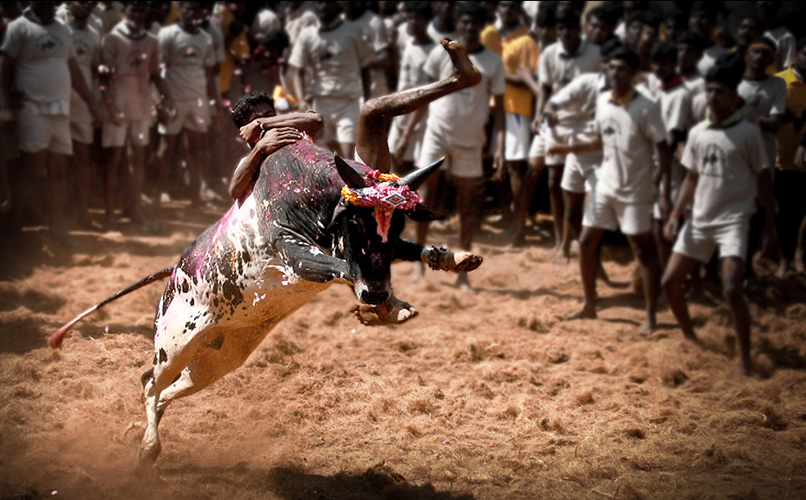
Jallikattu, taming the bull

Jallikattu is a popular bull-taming sport practiced primarily during the Pongal festival. The sport has been prominent since the Tamil classical period. It remains controversial and is considered cruel by various national and international animal rights activists and organizations. Conversely, supporters argue that the sport encourages the preservation of indigenous cattle; they say that while male bulls might otherwise be slaughtered due to their limited perceived economic importance in agriculture, Jallikattu provides an incentive for people to raise and care for them.

==== Kambala ====
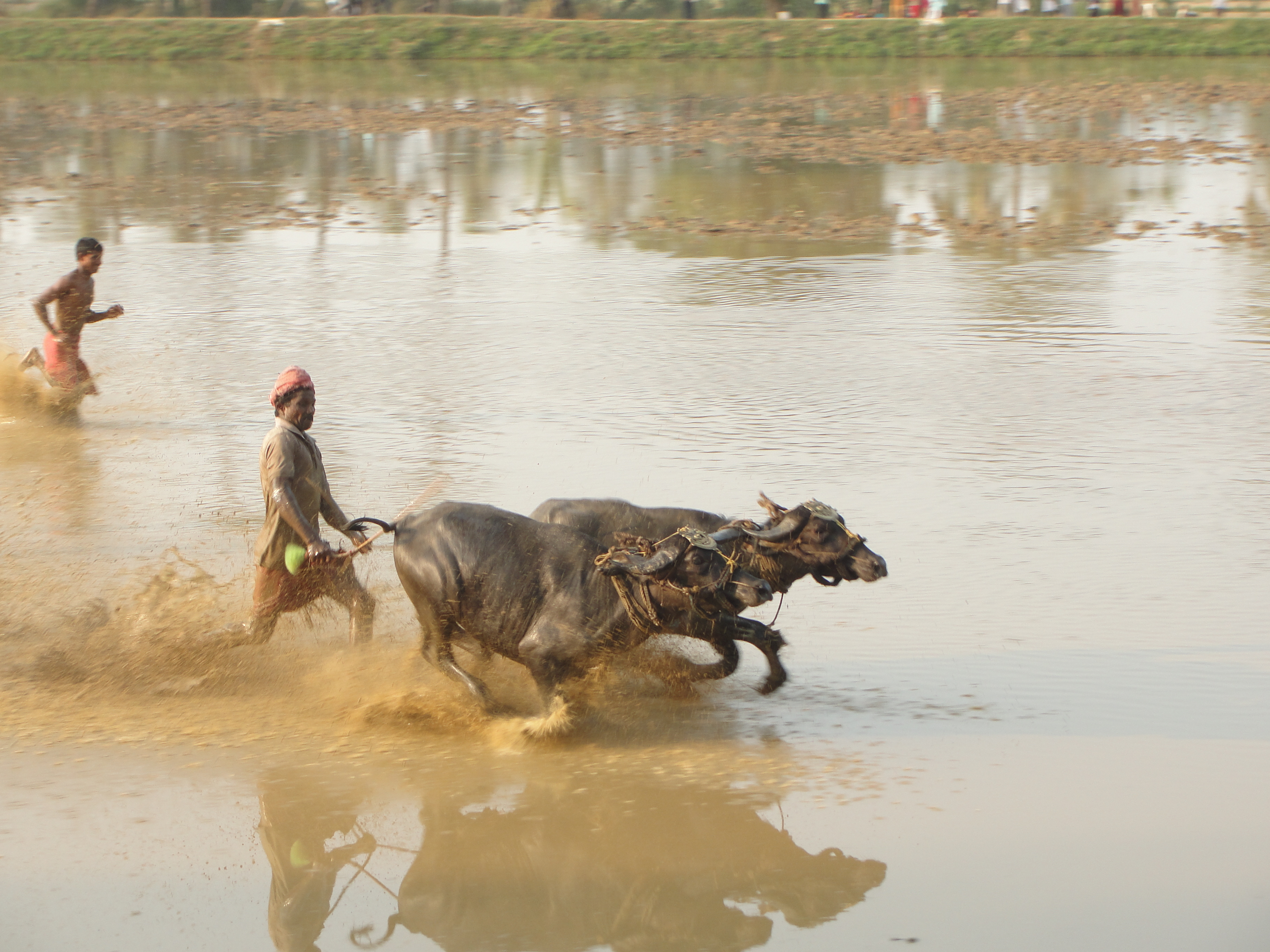
A Kambala race

Kambala is a traditional racing sport native to the coastal regions of Karnataka in South India. It is an annual event in which a person runs alongside a pair of buffaloes through a mud-filled track, typically covering a distance of 132 or 143 metres. The term Kambala roughly translates to "paddy-growing mud field" in the local Tulu language. The sport remains controversial and has drawn criticism from various international animal rights organizations.

==== Rekla race ====
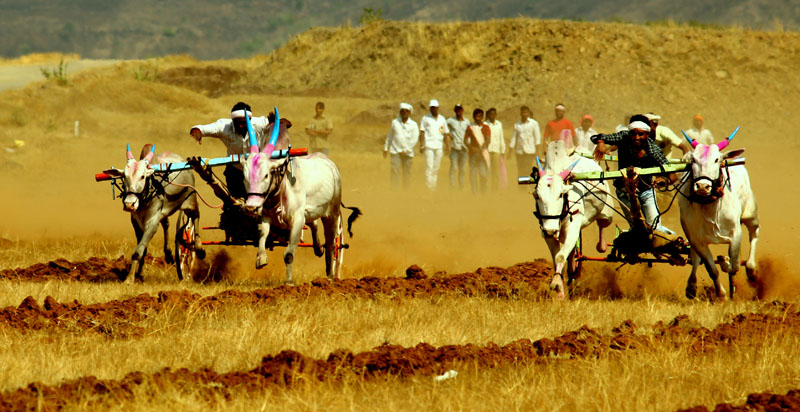
Rekla- bullock cart race

The Rekla race is a traditional form of bullock cart racing popular in Tamil Nadu. InIn May 2014, the Supreme Court of India banned the sport, along with Jallikattu, citing animal welfare concerns.

=== Other traditional and children's games ===
Uriyadi involves smashing a small earthen pot with a long stick, usually with a cloth wrapped around the eyes to prevent the participants from seeing the pot. Seasonal sports such as Dahi Handi also have a following.

Other regional sports include Ilavatta kal where huge spherical rocks are lifted, and Nondi, which is a hopscotch game played by folding one leg and hopping squares. Other regional games such as atya patya, hide-and-seek, Top, Lagori, Sack race, Blindfold-game, Nimbu Chamcha, Chase, langdi, surr, gatka, mallakhamb, chor police and Dhaba Kuti have dedicated followers, with kids playing most of these games. Indoor games include Pallanguzhi involving beads, Bambaram involving the spinning of a top, Dhayakattai which is a modified dice game, Aadu puli attam, Nungu vandi and Seechangal.

=== Other games ===
Other sports and games including Air sports, Water sports, Triathlon, Pentathlon, Arm Wrestling, Ball Hockey, Soft tennis, Australian rules football, Darts, Frisbee, Fistball and Tennikoit have dedicated followers and their own national sports federations.

India has achieved success in some of these games. They have won a silver medal at 2019 Ball Hockey World Championship. They have won five medals, including two gold at Commonwealth Tenpin Bowling Championships. They have won two medals at Asia-Pacific Fistball Championships.

== National teams ==
Sport	National Team	Association
Badminton	(M & W)	BAI
Baseball	(M, W)	ABFI
Basketball	(M, W)	BFI
Beach soccer	(M)	AIFF
Cricket	(M, W)	BCCI
Field hockey	(M, W)	HI
Football	(M, W)	AIFF
Futsal	(M)	AIFF
Handball	(M, W)	HFI
Ice hockey	(M, W)	IHAI
Kabaddi	(M, W)	AKFI
Kho kho	(M, W)	KKFI
Korfball	(Mixed)	KFI
Netball	(W)	NFI
Roller hockey	(M & W)	RSFI
Rugby league	(M)	IRFU
Rugby sevens	(M, W)	IRFU
Rugby union	(M, W)	IRFU
Softball	(M, W)	SBAI
Squash	(M, W)	SRFI
Tennis	(M, W, Mixed)	AITA
Volleyball	(M, W)	VFI
Water polo	(M, W)	SFI

== Sports tournaments ==
=== Multi-sport ===
Event	No of games	Participation	Seasons
National Games of India	36	38 (28 states + 8 Union territories + 2 Others)	36 (Summer); 5 (Winter)
Khelo India Youth Games	25	36 (28 states + 8 Union territories)	4
Khelo India University Games	17	176 universities from 20 states/union territories	2
Khelo India Winter Games	17	States/union territories	3
Khelo India Beach Games	3	States/union territories	3
Khelo India Para Games			1
North East Games		8 Northeast Indian states	3

=== Others ===
Game	Tournament
Auto racing	Indian National Rally Championship
Auto racing	JK Tyre National Racing Championship
Badminton	India Open
Badminton	Syed Modi Open
Badminton	Hyderabad Open
Badminton	Guwahati Masters
Badminton	Odisha Masters
Badminton	India International Challenge
Cricket	Ranji Trophy
Cricket	Irani Cup
Cricket	Vijay Hazare Trophy
Cricket	Duleep Trophy
Cricket	Deodhar Trophy
Cricket	Syed Mushtaq Ali Trophy
Cricket	Senior Women's Inter Zonal Multi-Day Trophy
Cricket	Senior Women's One-Day Trophy
Cricket	Senior Women's T20 Trophy
Football	Super Cup
Football	Durand Cup
Football	IFA Shield
Football	Santosh Trophy
Football	Rajmata Jijabai Trophy
Futsal	Futsal Club Championship
Futsal	Asian Premier Futsal Championship
Golf	Professional Golf Tour of India
Golf	Indian Open
Golf	Women's Indian Open
Ice hockey	Indian Ice Hockey Championship
Roller hockey	Indian Roller Hockey National Championship
Squash	National Squash Championship
Tennis	Maharashtra Open

== Sports leagues ==
=== Active ===
Sport	League	Abhrev.	Teams
Archery	Archery Premier League	APL	6
Arm wrestling	Pro Panja League	PPL	6
Badminton	Premier Badminton League	PBL	9
Basketball	India Basketball League	IBL	6
Cricket	Indian Premier League	IPL	10
Cricket	Women's Premier League	WPL	5
Field hockey	Hockey India League	HIL	8 M + 4 W
Equestrian	Equestrian Premier League	EPL	25
Football	Indian Super League	ISL	14
Football	Indian Women's League	IWL	8
Football	Indian Football League	IFL	12
Football	I-League 2	IL2	10
Football	I-League 3	IL3	20
Football	Indian Women's League 2	IWL2	14
Golf	Indian Golf Premier League	IGPL	6
Kabaddi	Pro Kabaddi League	PKL	12
Kho kho	Ultimate Kho Kho	UKK	6
Rugby sevens	Rugby Premier League	RPL	6
Shooting	Shooting League of India	SLI	6
Table tennis	Ultimate Table Tennis	UTT	8
Tennis	Tennis Premier League	TPL	8
Volleyball	Prime Volleyball League	PVL	10
Wrestling	Pro Wrestling League	PWL	6
Yogasana	Yogasana Super League	YSL	12

=== Defunct ===
Sport	League(s)
Basketball	UBA Pro Basketball League; Elite Pro Basketball League; 3x3 Pro Basketball League
Boxing	Super Boxing League
Volleyball	Indian Volley League; Pro Volleyball League
Tennis	Champions Tennis League
Cricket	Indian Cricket League
Football	National Football League
American football	Elite Football League of India
Field hockey	Premier Hockey League; World Series Hockey
Handball	Premier Handball League
Mixed martial arts	Super Fight League
Roll ball	Maha Roll Ball League

== Sports broadcasters ==
Major sports television networks include Star Sports, Sony Sports, Eurosport India, DD Sports, 1Sports. Historically, Doordarshan was the only broadcaster of multinational sports events and cricket in the country. In 1992, the government began giving licences for private television channels to be started. Star Sports is the first 24 hours sports channel in the country, with many foreign and Indian organisations starting dedicated sports channels later on. In recent years after 3G and 4G networks launched and became widespread in India, OTT (online streaming) apps became a big thing and the OTT market became very competitive. Indian sports broadcasters spend more on cricket then other sports. According to GroupM ESP's Sporting Nation report, in 2021, 444 endorsement deals happened, with 318 of them being signed by cricketers. In 2020, Indian sports industry spent 9,500 crore rupees, which it superseded in 2021 by a growth of 62%. Various companies spend a huge amount of money on advertising by signing various sports players for themselves such as Neeraj Chopra, PV Sindhu, Rohit Sharma and Virat Kohli etc.

=== Sports broadcasters ===
List of major sports channels in India:
Conglomerate	Channel(s)	Commentary Language	Digital streaming platform
JioStar	Star Sports 1 (SD & HD)	English	JioHotstar
JioStar	Star Sports 2 (SD & HD)	English	JioHotstar
JioStar	Star Sports 3 (SD)	English	JioHotstar
JioStar	Star Sports Select 1 (SD & HD)	English	JioHotstar
JioStar	Star Sports Select 2 (SD & HD)	English	JioHotstar
JioStar	Star Sports 1 Hindi (SD & HD)	Hindi	JioHotstar
JioStar	Star Sports 2 Hindi (SD & HD)	Hindi	JioHotstar
JioStar	Star Sports Khel (SD)	Hindi	JioHotstar
JioStar	Star Sports 1 Tamil (SD & HD)	Tamil	JioHotstar
JioStar	Star Sports 2 Tamil (SD & HD)	Tamil	JioHotstar
JioStar	Star Sports 1 Telugu (SD & HD)	Telugu	JioHotstar
JioStar	Star Sports 2 Telugu (SD & HD)	Telugu	JioHotstar
JioStar	Star Sports 1 Kannada (SD)	Kannada	JioHotstar
JioStar	Star Sports 2 Kannada (SD)	Kannada	JioHotstar
Sony Pictures Networks	Sony Sports Ten 1 (SD & HD)	English	SonyLIV
Sony Pictures Networks	Sony Sports Ten 2 (SD & HD)	English	SonyLIV
Sony Pictures Networks	Sony Sports Ten 5 (SD & HD)	English	SonyLIV
Sony Pictures Networks	Sony Sports Ten 3 Hindi (SD & HD)	Hindi	SonyLIV
Sony Pictures Networks	Sony Sports Ten 4 Tamil (SD)	Tamil	SonyLIV
Sony Pictures Networks	Sony Sports Ten 4 Telugu (SD)	Telugu	SonyLIV
Sony Pictures Networks	Sony Sports Ten 4 Kannada (SD)	Kannada	SonyLIV
Warner Bros. Discovery India	Eurosport (SD & HD)	English	Discovery+
Prasar Bharati	DD Sports, DD Sports 2.0 (Note: DD Sports air 'DD Sports 2.0' on Dish TV, Tata sky etc direct-to-home services amid international cricket matches, Cricket, football World cups due to Supreme Court of India's guidelines which restrict them from broadcasting these events on Terrestrial network.) (SD)	English and Hindi	
Zee Entertainment Enterprises	Unite 8 Sports 1 (SD)	Hindi	Zee5
Zee Entertainment Enterprises	Unite 8 Sports 1 (HD)	Hindi	Zee5
Zee Entertainment Enterprises	Unite 8 Sports 2 (SD)	English	Zee5
Zee Entertainment Enterprises	Unite 8 Sports 2 (HD)	English	Zee5

List of other Digital streaming platforms broadcasting sports in India:
Conglomerate	Network
Dream Sports	Fancode
Reliance	Jio TV
Shrachi Sports	SSEN
DAZN Group	DAZN
GXR Group	GXR.World
ZEE	Zee5

==== Former channels ====
- Neo Sports
- Neo Prime
- Sony ESPN
- Sony KIX
- Sony Ten Golf HD
- Sports18
- Star ESPN
- Zee Sports
- 1Sports

== Sports awards ==
- Major Dhyan Chand Khel Ratna — This is India's highest award for achievement in sports. (Note: This award was formally known as 'Rajiv Gandhi Khel Ratna Award', was named after former prime minister of India Rajiv Gandhi. It is renamed after Indian field hockey player Major Dhyan Chand.) It recognises "the spectacular and most outstanding performance in the field of sports by a sportsperson". As of 2018, the award comprises a medallion, a certificate, and a cash prize of ₹7.5 lakh (US$11,000).
- Dhyan Chand Award — lifetime achievement award in sport
- National Sports Awards — for excellence in sport
- Dronacharya Award — It is awarded for excellence in coaching. (Note: The award is named after Pandav and Kaurav's Guru, Acharya Dronacharya.) It honours coaches "who have done outstanding and meritorious work on a consistent basis", and is meant to motivate them towards "raising the standard of sportspersons". As of 2017, the award comprises a bronze statuette of Dronacharya, a certificate, ceremonial dress, and a cash prize of ₹5 lakh (US$7,200).
- Arjuna Award — For excellence in sport at world stage. It includes rupees 500,000 and bronze statue of Arjun. This award was founded in 1961. (Note: This award is named after Arjuna a Pandav prince, world's greatest archer and favourite student of Guru Dronacharya from India's ancient Hindu epic Mahabharat.)
- Tenzing Norgay National Adventure Award — This award is granted to the sportsperson, who did outstanding feat in the field of adventure sport. It is presented by president of India. This award is named after Indian mountaineer Tenzing Norgay, who was second ever person who climbed Mount Everest.
- BCCI Awards — It is a cricket award, in which Board of Control for Cricket in India handover awards in different categories to the cricket players.
- AIFF Awards — It is an award for football players, in which All India Football Federation handover awards in different categories to the football players.

== Sports education ==
=== Sports degree ===
In India, the schools and colleges normally have a sports teacher who manages, trains and coaches students in various sports for inter-school tournaments. To become a sport teacher in a school, one needs to have a sports diploma or degree, such as a Bachelor of Physical Education (also known by the abbreviation, B.P.Ed).

=== Sports universities and colleges ===
- Amity School of Physical Education and Sports Sciences, affiliated to Amity University, Noida
- Bombay Physical Culture Association College of Physical Education (BPCACPE)
- Chandrashekhar Agashe College of Physical Education, affiliated to Savitribai Phule Pune University
- College of Education and Physical Education (Marathi: शिक्षणशास्त्र आणि शारीरिक शिक्षणशास्त्र महाविद्यालय, जळगाव), affiliated to North Maharashtra University; run by Khandesh College Education Society
- College of Physical Education, Bharati Vidyapeeth
- D.Y. Patil Sports Academy
- Guru Gobind Singh Sports College, Lucknow
- Indira Gandhi Institute of Physical Education and Sports Sciences, University of Delhi
- Lakshmibai National College of Physical Education, associated with SAI
- Netaji Subhas National Institute of Sports (NIS), academic wing of Sports Authority of India (SAI); affiliated to Punjabi University and Baba Farid University of Health Sciences
- Lakshmibai National Institute of Physical Education (LNIPE)
- Tamil Nadu Physical Education and Sports University
- YMCA College of Physical Education
- Hanuman Vyayam Prasarak Mandal

== Sports equipment industry ==
The nation has a lot of firms that manufacture sport equipment. Some notable Indian brands are Sanspareils Greenlands (SG), (Note: All the cricket matches that BCCI organises are played with only SG's balls including Test, domestic, International, IPL cricket matches.) BDM and TYKA. According to a report, sports equipment businesses of India were worth of US$20 bn in 2020. It is estimated that in 2027, the industry will be worth US$100 bn. Jalandhar is a sport goods hub, and as per ThePrint, it is worth US$241,569,000. Meerut is another sports good industry hub in India, which exports sports goods around the world.

The leading sports equipment manufacturing brands in India are Nivia, Cosco, Provogue (manufactures sportswears and apparels), Seven (footwears, casuals and sportswears), SIX5SIX (sportswears, equipment), SS.

Nivia is the official ball partner of ISL and the Basketball Federation of India.

== See also ==
- India at the Olympics
- India at the Asian Games
- India at the South Asian Games
- India at the Commonwealth Games
- India at the Lusophony Games
- India at the Military World Games
- Indian Olympic Association
- India at the Paralympics
- India at the Asian Para Games
- Paralympic Committee of India
- India at the Deaflympics
- India at the Special Olympics
- Special Olympics Bharat
- India at the Universiade
- India at the Gymnasiade
- National Games of India
- Khelo India Youth Games
- Khelo India University Games
- Khelo India Winter Games
- Sports Authority of India (SAI)
- List of sports events in India
- India–Pakistan sports rivalries
- Top 5 Adventure Sports in India

== Cited works ==
- Bowker, John (2000). The Concise Oxford Dictionary of World Religions. Oxford University Press.
- Carmody, Denise Lardner; Carmody, John (1996). Serene Compassion. Oxford University Press US.
- Feuerstein, Georg (1998). The Yoga Tradition: Its History, Literature, Philosophy and Practice. Hohm Press. ISBN 0-934252-88-2.
- Johnson, W.J. (2009). A Dictionary of Hinduism. Oxford University Press.
- Keown, Damien (2004). A Dictionary of Buddhism. Oxford University Press.
- King, Richard (1999). Indian Philosophy. An Introduction to Hindu and Buddhist Thought. Georgetown University Press.
- Olsson, Tova (2023). Yoga and Tantra: History, Philosophy & Mythology. Motilall Banarsidass.
- Sarbacker, Stuart Ray (2005). Samādhi: The Numinous and Cessative in Indo-Tibetan Yoga. SUNY Press.
- White, David Gordon (2011). "Yoga, Brief History of an Idea" (PDF). Yoga in Practice. Princeton University Press. pp. 1–23.
- "yoga". OED Online. Oxford University Press. September 2015.
