= Kho kho in India =

Traditional Indian sport

- Country: India
- Governing body: Kho Kho Federation of India
- National team: India national team

Club competitions
- Ultimate Kho Kho (2022–present)

International competitions
- Kho Kho World Cup; Asian Kho Kho Championship; South Asian Games

Kho kho is a popular traditional Indian game that is a variation of tag. Within India, it is played between states in the National Games of India and Khelo India and between franchise teams in the Ultimate Kho Kho league, which has the backing of the Kho Kho Federation of India (KKFI). At the international level, India plays kho kho in the South Asian Games and the Kho Kho World Cup.

== History ==
Kho kho has been played for thousands of years within India, having been originally played by players on chariots (which were called raths) and been known as rathera. The game's rules were standardised in 1914, and it was demonstrated at the 1936 Summer Olympics.

The latest (56th) edition of the National Championship, which is conducted annually by KKFI, concluded in Delhi on 1 April 2024 with Maharashtra winning both the men's and women's National titles.

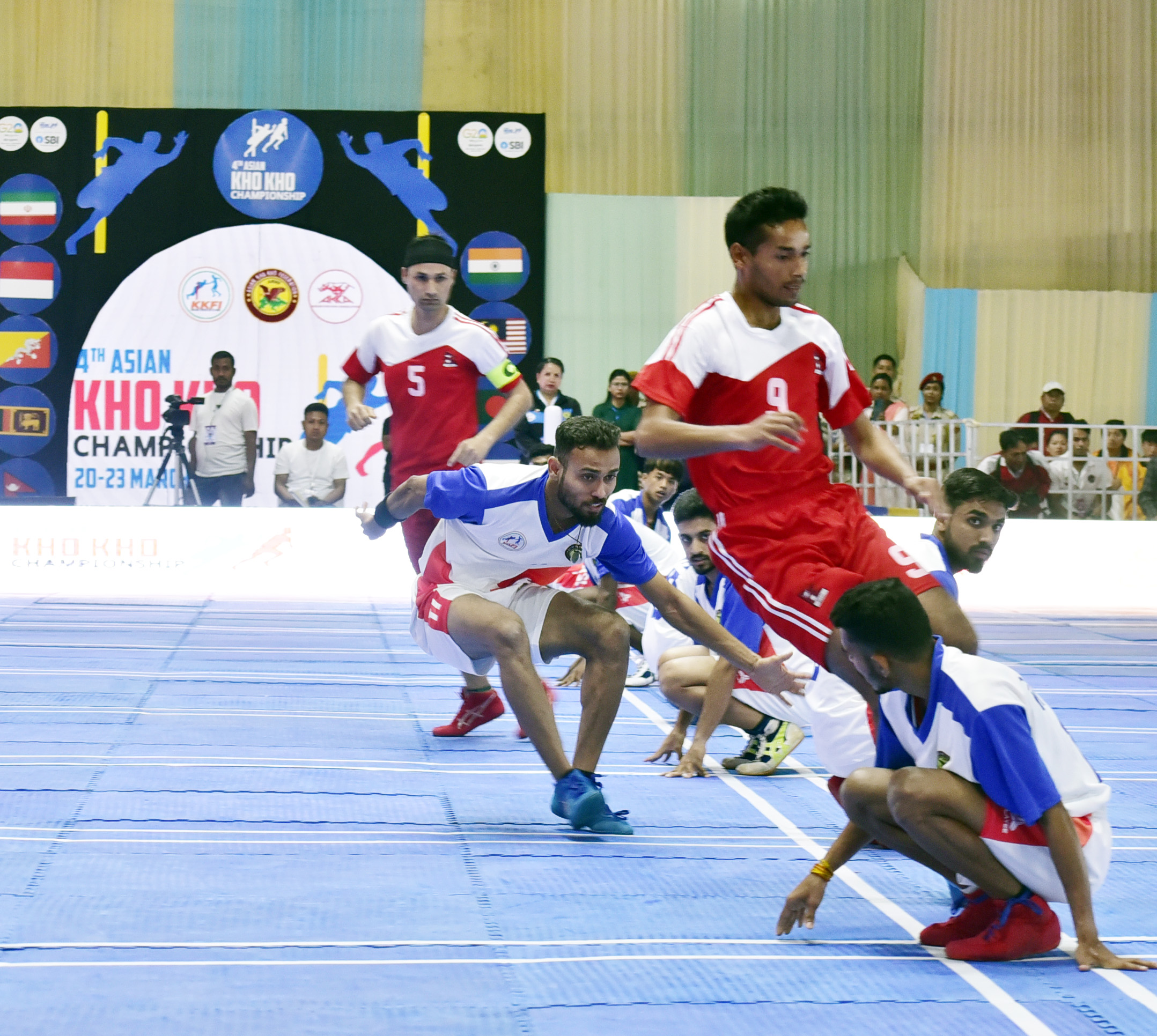
India vs Nepal at the 2023 Asian Kho Kho Championship in Assam

The sport was first introduced to the South Asian Games in the India-hosted 2016 edition. In 2022, an Indian franchise league known as Ultimate Kho Kho (UKK) began, featuring a modified format of kho kho. In 2025, the inaugural Kho Kho World Cup was played in the UKK format; it was hosted and won by India.

== Performance record ==
=== Men's team ===
==== Kho Kho World Cup ====
Year	Winner	Runners-up	3rd Place
2025	India	Nepal	

==== South Asian Games ====
Year	Winner	Runners-up	3rd Place
2016	India	Bangladesh	Nepal
2019	India	Bangladesh	Nepal

=== Women's team ===
==== Kho Kho World Cup ====
Year	Winner	Runners-up	3rd Place
2025	India	Nepal	

==== South Asian Games ====
Year	Winner	Runners-up	3rd Place
2016	India	Bangladesh	Nepal
2019	India	Nepal	Bangladesh

== Governance ==
The Kho Kho Federation of India administers kho kho within India.

== National award recipients ==
Year	Recipient	Award	Gender
1970	Sudhir B. Parab	Arjuna Award	Male
1971	Achala Suberao Devra	Arjuna Award	Male
1973	Bhavna H. Parikh	Arjuna Award	Female
1974	N. C. Sarolkar	Arjuna Award	Female
1975	Shreerang J. Inamdar	Arjuna Award	Male
1975	Usha Vasant Nagarkar	Arjuna Award	Female
1976	S. R. Dharwadkar	Arjuna Award	Male
1981	Sushma Sarolkar	Arjuna Award	Female
1981	H. M. Takalkar	Arjuna Award	Male
1983	Veena Narayan Parab	Arjuna Award	Female
1984	S. Prakash	Arjuna Award	Male
1985	S. B. Kulkarni	Arjuna Award	Female
1998	Shobha Narayan	Arjuna Award	Female
2020	Kale Sarika Sudhakar	Arjuna Award	Female
2000	Gopal Purushottam Phadke	Dronacharya Award	Male

== See also ==
- Kabaddi in India
- India women's national kho kho team
- India men's national kho kho team
