= Nasreen Shaikh =

Indian kho-kho player

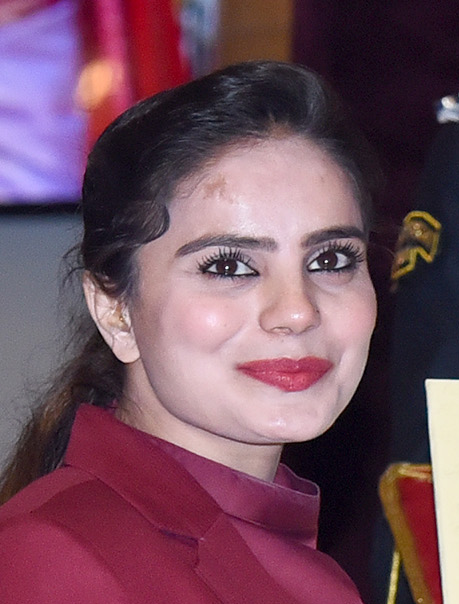
Shaikh in 2024

Nasreen Shaikh (born 7 November 1998) is an Indian kho-kho player from Delhi. She was a former captain of the India women's national kho kho team. She became the second kho-kho player to receive the Arjuna Award. Kho-Kho Federation of India screened her bio-pic during the opening ceremony of the Ultimate Kho-kho, a National league.

== Early life and education ==
Nasreen was born in Shakurpur, Delhi. Her father, Mohammed Ghafoor, is a contractor who polishes and sells utensils. She studied at the Government Senior Secondary School in Kohat Enclave and started playing kho-kho in Class 3. After schooling, she graduated from Delhi University's Daulat Ram College with a Bachelor of Arts degree. Later, she did Bachelors in Physical Education from the same college. She has six sisters and four brothers. She has a contract job with the Airports Authority of India.

== Career ==
She captained the Indian women's kho-kho team at the South Asian Games, where India won the gold medal. She retired after her successful campaign in the inaugural Kho Kho World Cup.

She was part of the Indian women's team that won the first Kho Kho World Cup at New Delhi in January 2025. The Indian team defeated South Korea, IR Iran and Malaysia in the group stages, Bangladesh in quarterfinals and South Africa in semifinals. They defeated Nepal 78–40 in the final.

== Awards ==
- Arjuna Award 2023.
- BBC ‘Sportswoman of the Year 2025.
