= Priyanka Ingle =

Indian kho kho player

Priyanka Hanumant Ingle (born 3 October 2000) is an Indian kho kho player from Maharashtra. She plays for the India women's national kho kho team as an allrounder. She captained the Indian women's team that won the inaugural Kho Kho World Cup held at Delhi in January 2025.

== Early life and career ==
Ingle is from Pune, Maharashtra. Her father, Hanumanth Ingle, is a farmer from Kaij taluk, Beed district. She did her schooling at Shri Sayajinath Maharaj Vidyalaya, Wadmukhwadi, in Pimpri-Chinchwad, near Pune. She began playing kho kho in Class 5 at her school and learnt her basics from her first coach Avinash Karvande. She did her MCom and is working with the Income Tax Department in Pune.

== Career ==
Ingle captained the Indian women's team which won the first Kho Kho World Cup at New Delhi in January 2025. The Indian team defeated South Korea, IR Iran and Malaysia in the group stages, Bangladesh in quarterfinals and South Africa in semifinals, to make it to the final. They defeated Nepal 78–40 in the final. She was awarded the Best Player of the tournament. She was part of the Indian team that won the gold in the Asian Kho Kho Championships in 2016.

=== Awards ===
In 2022, she received the Rani Laxmibai Award which is given for best performance in the Senior Nationals.

On 22 June 2025 at Nagpur she has received Famous Awards 2025 by Shri Nitin Gadkari Union Minister of Road Transport and Highways for her outstanding performance.
