= Bangladesh men's national kho kho team =

Bangladeshi men's kho kho team

Bangladesh
- Association: Bangladesh Kho Kho Federation
- Confederation: International Kho Kho Federation (IKKF)
- Head Coach: Meer Kaiser Sadik
- Captain: Md Shofiqul Islam

World Cup
- Appearances: 1 (first in 2025)
- Best result: Quarter-finals (2025)

Asian Kho Kho Championship
- Appearances: 4 (first in 1996)
- Best result: (silver) 2nd (1996, 2000, 2016)
Medal record
Event	1st	2nd	3rd
Asian Championship	0	3	1
Total	0	3	1
Asian Championship
Silver medal – second place	1996 Kolkata	
Silver medal – second place	2000 Dhaka	
Silver medal – second place	2016 Indore	
Bronze medal – third place	2023 Assam	

The Bangladesh men's national kho kho team represents Bangladesh in international men's Kho Kho competitions. It is governed by the Bangladesh Kho Kho Federation and is a member of the International Kho Kho Federation (IKKF). Bangladesh reached the quarter-finals of the 2025 Kho Kho World Cup, its only World Cup appearance to date, after winning all four of its group matches; it lost to Nepal. The team has been runner-up at the Asian Kho Kho Championship three times (1996, 2000 and 2016) and third in 2023.

== History ==
=== Asian Championship (1996–2023) ===
Bangladesh has played in every Asian Kho Kho Championship held to date. It lost the final to India in the first edition, in Kolkata in 1996, and was runner-up again in 2000 as hosts in Dhaka and in 2016 in Indore. In the 2023 edition in Assam it finished third, behind India and Nepal.

=== 2025 Kho Kho World Cup ===
Bangladesh entered the inaugural Kho Kho World Cup, held at the Indira Gandhi Indoor Stadium in New Delhi from 13 to 19 January 2025. It won all four group matches, beating Sri Lanka (56–24), the United States (83–26), South Korea (119–10) and Poland (72–46), and progressed to the quarter-finals as group winner.

In the quarter-final on 17 January, Bangladesh lost 67–18 to Nepal, who went on to reach the final.

== Tournament history ==
=== Kho Kho World Cup ===
Kho Kho World Cup
Year	Host city	Position
2025	New Delhi, India	Quarter-finals

Kho Kho World Cup record
Year	Result	Position	Pld	W	D*	L
(Bangladesh) 2025	Quarter-finals	Top 8	5	4	0	1
Total	1/1	0 Titles	5	4	0	1

=== Asian Kho Kho Championship ===
Asian Kho Kho Championship
Year	Host	Position
1996	Kolkata, India	(silver) 2nd
2000	Dhaka, Bangladesh	(silver) 2nd
2016	Indore, India	(silver) 2nd
2023	Assam, India	3rd

== Recent results and fixtures ==
=== 2025 match results ===
Competition	Date	Round	Opponent	Score	Venue
World Cup	14 January 2025	Group stage	Sri Lanka	56–24	Indira Gandhi Indoor Stadium, New Delhi
World Cup	14 January 2025	Group stage	United States	83–26	Indira Gandhi Indoor Stadium, New Delhi
World Cup	15 January 2025	Group stage	South Korea	119–10	Indira Gandhi Indoor Stadium, New Delhi
World Cup	16 January 2025	Group stage	Poland	72–46	Indira Gandhi Indoor Stadium, New Delhi
World Cup	17 January 2025	Quarter-final	Nepal	18–67	Indira Gandhi Indoor Stadium, New Delhi

== Coaching staff ==
Position	Name
Team manager	(Bangladesh) Md Zahidul Islam
Head coach	(Bangladesh) Meer Kaiser Sadik
Assistant coach	(Bangladesh) Md Shohag Milon

== Players ==
=== Captains ===
Md Shofiqul Islam captained Bangladesh at the 2025 World Cup.

== See also ==
- Bangladesh women's national kho kho team
- Nepal men's national kho kho team
- Kho Kho World Cup
- Asian Kho Kho Championship
- International Kho Kho Federation
