= Chaithra B. =

Indian kho kho player

Personal information
- Nationality: Indian
- Born: January 8, 2002 (age 24) Kuruburu, T. Narasipura taluk, Mysuru district, Karnataka, India
- Education: Studied at Kanakapura Degula Mutt School, Kuruburu
- Occupation: Kho kho player
- Years active: 2010s–present
- Parents: Basavanna (father); Nagarathna (mother)

Sport
- Country: India
- Sport: Kho kho
- Position: Defender
- Team: India women's national kho kho team
- Coached by: Manjunath

Chaithra B. (born 8 January 2002) is an Indian kho kho player from Karnataka. She plays for the India women's national kho kho team as a defender. She was part of the Indian women's team that won the inaugural Kho Kho World Cup held at New Delhi in January 2025.

== Early life and education ==
Chaithra is from Kuruburu village, T. Narasipura taluk, Mysuru district, Karnataka. She was the daughter of Basavanna and Nagarathna. She did her schooling at Kanakapura Degula Mutt school, Kuruburu. She learnt her basics from her first coach Manjunath in Kuruburu village.

== Career ==
Chaithra played a key role in the Indian women's team victory with a 'Dream Run' in both the semifinal and final of the first Kho Kho World Cup at New Delhi in January 2025. The Indian team defeated South Korea, IR Iran and Malaysia in the group stages, Bangladesh in quarterfinals and South Africa in semifinals. They defeated Nepal 78–40 in the final. She was awarded the 'Player of the Match' award in the final match for her 'dream run'.

She was felicitated by Kanakapura Sri Degula Mutt Seer Channabasappa Swamiji on 25 January 2025 at Vidyadarshini Convent and High School premises, Kuruburu. On 7 February 2025, she was also felicitated by Mysuru Zilla Kreeda Mathu Samskruthika Vedike, in Mysuru where Kho kho player and Arjuna Awardee Shobha Narayan requested the state government to consider kho kho players for Ekalavya awards. The state government announced Rs.5 lakh cash award for Chaithra.
