= Neeta Devi =

Indian kho kho player

Neeta Devi is an Indian kho kho player from Himachal Pradesh. She plays for the India women's national kho kho team as a Wazir. She was part of the Indian women's team that won the inaugural Kho Kho World Cup held at New Delhi in January 2025.

== Early life and education ==
Devi is from Kharahal valley, Kullu district, Himachal Pradesh. She did her schooling at Government Senior Secondary School, Kharahal, where started playing kho kho. By 2014 she began participating in national level competitions and took part in 13 National events. Her learnt the basics from her school's Director of Physical Education, Dev Chand Thakur. She is doing her masters in physical education at Lovely Professional University.

== Career ==
Devi was part of the Indian women's team that won the first Kho Kho World Cup at New Delhi in January 2025. The Indian team defeated South Korea, IR Iran and Malaysia in the group stages, Bangladesh in quarterfinals and South Africa in semifinals. They defeated Nepal 78–40 in the final.
