= Ashwini Shinde =

Indian kho kho player

Ashwini Appasaheb Shinde (10 October 2007) is an Indian kho kho player from Maharashtra. She plays for the India women's national kho kho team as a defender. She was part of the Indian women's team that won the inaugural Kho Kho World Cup held at New Delhi in January 2025.

== Early life and education ==
Shinde is from a farming family in Khandobachiwadi village, Mohol taluka, Solapur district, Maharashtra. She did her schooling at Zilla Parishad Primary School, Khandobachiwadi. She did her Class 12 at Shripatrao Bhosale Vidyalaya, Dharashiv. She has two sisters, and both played kho kho. She started playing kho kho at a very early age, from Class 2. Her first coaches were Kishore Gund and Hari Shinde.

== Career ==
She took part in the Indian women's team that won the first Kho Kho World Cup at New Delhi in January 2025. The Indian team defeated South Korea, IR Iran and Malaysia in the group stages, Bangladesh in quarterfinals and South Africa in semifinals. They defeated Nepal 78–40 in the final. She was declared as the Best Player in the quarterfinal match against Bangladesh.

She represented Maharashtra in the Senior National Kho Kho Championships and National Games. At the 42nd Maharashtra State Kho Kho Championship, she was one of the two top players who were awarded electric bikes for outstanding performance.
