= Subhashree Singh =

Indian kho kho player

Subhashree Sing (born 19 April 2006) is an Indian kho kho player from Odisha. She plays for the India women's national kho kho team as an allrounder. She was part of the Indian women's team that won the inaugural Kho Kho World Cup held at New Delhi in January 2025.

== Early life and education ==
Singh is from Nilagiri village, Balasore district, Odisha. She is the daughter of Rabindra Singh, a farmer. She is doing her graduation at Kalinga Institute of Social Sciences in Bhubaneswar. She trains at Odisha Kho Kho High Performance Centre at Bhubaneswar. One of her first coaches was Sanhita Das.

== Career ==
Singh was part of the Indian women's team that won the first Kho Kho World Cup at New Delhi in January 2025. The Indian team defeated South Korea, IR Iran and Malaysia in the group stages, Bangladesh in quarterfinals and South Africa in semifinals. They defeated Nepal 78–40 in the final.

In January/February 2025, she was part of the Odisha team that won a silver medal at the 38th National Games held at Haldwani, Uttarakhand. In October 2024, she was part of the Odisha team that won the Khelo India Senior women kho kho league, phase 3 at Coimbatore, Tamil Nadu. She was also part of the Odisha team that won the silver medal in the 5th Khelo India Youth Games in January 2024. In January 2023, she participated in the Khelo India women national kho kho league for juniors, where Odisha won a gold medal at Ranchi, Jharkhand.

In October 2019, she was part of the Odisha team that won the 30th sub junior National Kho Kho Championship at Albert Ekka Stadium in Ranchi.
