= Nazia Bibi =

Indian kho kho player

Nazia Bibi (born 2003) is an Indian kho kho player from Jammu and Kashmir. She plays for the India women's national kho kho team as an attacker. She was part of the Indian women's team that won the inaugural Kho Kho World Cup held at New Delhi in January 2025.

== Early life and education ==
Bibi is from a tribal family from Nagrota, Jammu. Her father Sabar Ali is a businessman and her mother, Zulekha Bibi, is a housewife. They belong to the nomadic Bakarwal community and live at Ban,Nagrota Jammu Jammu-Srinagar National Highway 44. She is doing her BA at Padma Shri Padma Sachdev Government College for Women in Jammu. She started with athletics but shifted to kho kho in Class 6.

== Career ==
Bibi was part of the Indian women's team that won the first Kho Kho World Cup at New Delhi in January 2025. The Indian team defeated South Korea, IR Iran and Malaysia in the group stages, Bangladesh in quarterfinals and South Africa in semifinals. They defeated Nepal 78–40 in the final.

She was felicitated by the local leaders after returning from Delhi following the Indian team's World Cup victory.
