= Reshma Rathod =

Indian kho kho player

Reshma Subhash Rathod (born 31 December 2001) is an Indian kho kho player from Maharashtra. She plays for the India women's national kho kho team as an allrounder. She was part of the Indian women's team that won the inaugural Kho Kho World Cup held at New Delhi in January 2025.

== Early life and education ==
Rathod is from Badlapur village, Thane district, Maharashtra. Her father Subhash Rathod is a truck driver and her mother, Ghanubai, is a housewife. She is the youngest of five siblings. She did her graduation at Ulhasnagar's SST College of Arts and Commerce. In 2010, she started playing kho kho while studying Class 5. In 2024, she bagged a government job at Nashik in sports quota.

== Career ==
Rathod was part of the Indian women's team that won the first Kho Kho World Cup at New Delhi in January 2025. The Indian team defeated South Korea, IR Iran and Malaysia in the group stages, Bangladesh in quarterfinals and South Africa in semifinals. They defeated Nepal 78–40 in the final.

She first represented Maharashtra in a big tournament, the Under 14 National tournament in Maharashtra when she was in Class 8, where she wore shoes in a match for the first time and played on a mat. Later on, she received Khelo India scholarship of Rs.10,000 per month for five years, which helped her family and supported her in the sport.
