= Opina Bhilar =

Indian kho kho player (born 2001)

Opinaben Devjibhai Bhilar (born 8 July 2001) is an Indian kho kho player from Gujarat. She plays for the India women's national kho kho team as an allrounder. She was part of the Indian women's team that won the inaugural Kho Kho World Cup held at New Delhi in January 2025.

== Early life and education ==
Bhilar is from Biliamba village, Dang district, Gujarat. Her Devjibhai Bhilar is a farmer. After studying till Class 8 at Biliamba Primary School in her village, she moved to District Level Sports School, Tapi and trained under her first coach Sunil Mistry.

== Career ==
Bhilar represented Gujarat in four Senior National Kho Kho Championships and in 2023 Gujarat finished 7th at Delhi, where Bhilar was selected among the probables for the senior national camp.

In 2018, she shifted to athletics, as she was good in sprints too, and joined the academy at Vadodara. During her short stint in athletics, she suffered an ACL injury in 2019 but she worked hard on rehab during the COVID-19 lockdown and came back to kho kho in 2021.

She was part of the Indian women's team that won the first Kho Kho World Cup at New Delhi in January 2025. The Indian team defeated South Korea, IR Iran and Malaysia in the group stages, Bangladesh in quarterfinals and South Africa in semifinals. They defeated Nepal 78–40 in the final.
