= Nirmala Bhati =

Indian kho kho player

Nirmala Bhati (born 1999) is an Indian kho kho player from Rajasthan. She plays for the India women's national kho kho team as a Wazir. She was part of the Indian women's team that won the inaugural Kho Kho World Cup held at New Delhi in January 2025.

== Early life and education ==
Bhati is from Parewadi village, Kuchaman subdivision, Nagaur district, Rajasthan. She is a student of Chandigarh University.

== Career ==
Bhati was part of the Indian women's team that won the first Kho Kho World Cup at New Delhi in January 2025. The Indian team defeated South Korea, IR Iran and Malaysia in the group stages, Bangladesh in quarterfinals and South Africa in semifinals. They defeated Nepal 78–40 in the final. She was declared as the Best Player of the World Cup. She was felicitated after returning to her village following a successful campaign at the World Cup in Delhi.

=== Coaching career ===
Bhati is one of the senior most Indian players in the team after Nasreen Shaikh. She has also taken part in the sports administration and coached the New Zealand team in preparation for the World Cup in Delhi.
