= Anshu Kumari =

Indian kho kho player

Anshu Kumari (born 30 January 2008) is an Indian kho kho player from Delhi. She plays for the India women's national kho kho team as an allrounder. She was part of the Indian women's team that won the inaugural kho kho World Cup held at Delhi in January 2025.

== Career ==
Kumari played a key role in the Indian women's team victory in the first Kho Kho World Cup at New Delhi in January 2025. The Indian team defeated South Korea, IR Iran and Malaysia in the group stages, Bangladesh in quarterfinals and South Africa in semifinals. They defeated Nepal 78–40 in the final. She was awarded the 'Best Attacker' award for the final match.
