= Vaishnavi Powar =

Indian kho kho player

Vaishnavi Bajarang Powar (2 September 2006) is an Indian kho kho player from Maharashtra. She plays for the India women's national kho kho team as a defender. She was part of the Indian women's team that won the inaugural Kho Kho World Cup held at New Delhi in January 2025.

== Early life and education ==
Powar is from Chandur-Shahunagar, Ichalkaranji village in Kagal taluka, Kolhapur district, Maharashtra. The family is into powerloom weaving. She studied at Gangamai Girls High School and later joined arts stream at the Junior College in Ichalkaranji.

== Career ==
Powar was part of the Indian women's team that won the first Kho Kho World Cup at New Delhi in January 2025. The Indian team defeated South Korea, IR Iran and Malaysia in the group stages, Bangladesh in quarterfinals and South Africa in semifinals. They defeated Nepal 78–40 in the final. Earlier in December 2024, she attended a selection camp for 60 probables at New Delhi before getting the nod for the final 15.
