= Monika Sah =

Indian kho kho player

Monika Sah is an Indian kho kho player from Bihar. She plays for the India women's national kho kho team as an allrounder. She was part of the Indian women’s team that won the inaugural Kho Kho World Cup held at New Delhi in January 2025.

== Early life and career ==
Sah is from Dimha village, Gopalpur block, Naugachhia sub division, Bhagalpur district, Bihar. She hails from a poor family and is born to Binod Sah and Jura Devi. They live in a mud house in Dimha village. Her father used to sell vegetables and occasionally pull a rickshaw. He later also drove auto rickshaw to earn a living for the family.

== Career ==
Sah took part in the Indian women's team that won the first Kho Kho World Cup at New Delhi in January 2025. The Indian team defeated South Korea, IR Iran and Malaysia in the group stages, Bangladesh in quarterfinals and South Africa in semifinals. They defeated Nepal 78-40 in the final. She has captained the Bihar team in the domestic tournaments.

After returning from the World Cup victory, she was felicitated by the local leaders, including Naugachhia sub division president Preeti Kumari.
