= Meenu Dhatterwal =

Indian kho kho player

Meenu Dhatterwal (born 23 November 2006) is an Indian kho kho player from Haryana. She plays for the India women's national kho kho team as a defender. She was part of the Indian women's team that won the inaugural Kho Kho World Cup held at New Delhi in January 2025.

== Early life and career ==
Dhatterwal is from Bithmara village, Uklana Mandi, Hisar district, Haryana.

She took part in the Indian women's team that won the first Kho Kho World Cup at New Delhi in January 2025. The Indian team defeated South Korea, IR Iran and Malaysia in the group stages, Bangladesh in quarterfinals and South Africa in semifinals. They defeated Nepal 78–40 in the final.

On her return to the village after the World Cup victory, a grand welcome was organised by the local people including Uklana MLA Naresh Selwal and former minister Anoop Dhanak. She was taken in a procession in an open jeep amidst fire crackers and music, and was later felicitated. On 18 February 2025, Haryana chief minister Nayab Singh Saini visited her house and complimented her for the victory.
