= Magai Majhi =

Indian kho kho player

Magai Majhi (born 18 August 2004) is an Indian kho kho player from Odisha. She plays for the India women's national kho kho team as a defender. She was part of the Indian women's team that won the inaugural Kho Kho World Cup held at New Delhi in January 2025.

== Early life and education ==
Majhi is born into a tribal family from Kasnadara village in Chandragiri panchayat, Kashipur block, Rayagada district, Odisha. She is the daughter of Damu Majhi, a farmer, and Budhwari Majhi. She trains at the Odisha Kho Kho High Performance Centre at Bhubaneswar. She is doing her graduation in arts at Kalinga Institute of Social Sciences. She started playing kho kho in 2013.

== Career ==
Majhi was part of the Indian women's team that won the first Kho Kho World Cup at New Delhi in January 2025. The Indian team defeated South Korea, IR Iran and Malaysia in the group stages, Bangladesh in quarterfinals and South Africa in semifinals. They defeated Nepal 78–40 in the final.

After returning from the World Cup victory, she was taken out on a road show in Rayagada and felicitated by the local MLA Appalaswamy Kadraka. On 18 February 2025, she was also felicitated by the district collector Parul Patawari in the presence of other district officers and media.

She was part of the Odisha senior women's team that won the silver medal at the National Games held in Haldwani, Uttarakhand in January/February 2025. She also took part in the Odisha team which won the Khelo India senior women kho kho league phase 3 at Coimbatore in 2024. She was also part of the Odisha team that won the silver medal in the 36th National Games at Ahmedabad in October 2022. She took part in the 53rd Senior National Kho Kho Championship at Chhattisgarh in December 2019 where Odisha women won a bronze medal.
