= Shree Pawanputra Vyayam Mandir =

Shree Pawanputra Vyayam Mandir (SPVM) is a gym in Chembur, Mumbai in Maharashtra state providing training and guidance in sports such as gymnastics, both artistic & rhythmic, Mallakhamb, Yogasana, Power Lifting and Weight Training.

SPVM is the oldest gymnasium in Mumbai suburb, established on 14 November 1963 by freedom fighter, Shri Ramnath Hariram Pathare. SPVM is pioneer of Gymnastics for the youngsters in the entire State, having started with Indian pole Mallakhamb in 1963 and gymnastics in 1967. SPVM made successful leap into the Indian Gymnastics Federation in 1976.
