= England men's national kho kho team =

English men's kho kho team

England
- Association: Kho Kho Federation of England
- Confederation: International Kho Kho Federation (IKKF)

World Cup
- Appearances: 1 (first in 2025)
- Best result: Quarter-finals (2025)

The England men's national kho kho team represents England in international men's Kho Kho competitions. It is governed by the Kho Kho Federation of England and is a member of the International Kho Kho Federation (IKKF). England reached the quarter-finals of the 2025 Kho Kho World Cup, its only World Cup appearance to date, after winning its group; it lost to South Africa.

== History ==
=== 2025 Kho Kho World Cup ===
England entered the inaugural Kho Kho World Cup, held at the Indira Gandhi Indoor Stadium in New Delhi from 13 to 19 January 2025, and was placed in Group D. Reports before the tournament described the Indian community as playing a big role in popularising kho kho in England. It won all four of its group matches, beating Germany (60–38), Australia (44–27), Malaysia (52–32) and Kenya (64–23), and finished top of the group.

In the quarter-final on 17 January, England lost 58–38 to South Africa, who went on to reach the semi-finals.

=== Future ===
The next Kho Kho World Cup is scheduled for 2027 in Birmingham, England.

== Tournament history ==
=== Kho Kho World Cup ===
Kho Kho World Cup
Year	Host city	Position
2025	New Delhi, India	Quarter-finals
2027	Birmingham, England	To be determined

Kho Kho World Cup record
Year	Result	Position	Pld	W	D*	L
(England) 2025	Quarter-finals	Top 8	5	4	0	1
Total	1/1	0 Titles	5	4	0	1

== Recent results and fixtures ==
=== 2025 match results ===
Competition	Date	Round	Opponent	Score	Venue
World Cup	14 January 2025	Group D	Germany	60–38	Indira Gandhi Indoor Stadium, New Delhi
World Cup	14 January 2025	Group D	Australia	44–27	Indira Gandhi Indoor Stadium, New Delhi
World Cup	15 January 2025	Group D	Malaysia	52–32	Indira Gandhi Indoor Stadium, New Delhi
World Cup	16 January 2025	Group D	Kenya	64–23	Indira Gandhi Indoor Stadium, New Delhi
World Cup	17 January 2025	Quarter-final	South Africa	38–58	Indira Gandhi Indoor Stadium, New Delhi

== See also ==
- England women's national kho kho team
- South Africa men's national kho kho team
- Kho Kho World Cup
- International Kho Kho Federation
