= India women's national kho kho team =

Indian women's kho kho team

India
- Association: Kho Kho Federation of India
- Confederation: International Kho Kho Federation
- Head Coach: Sumit Bhatia
- Captain: Priyanka Ingle

World Cup
- Appearances: 1 (first in 2025)
- Best result: (gold) 1st (2025)

Asian Kho Kho Championship
- Appearances: 2 (first in 2016)
- Best result: (gold) 1st (2016, 2023)
Medal record
Event	1st	2nd	3rd
Kho Kho World Cup	1	0	0
Asian Championship	2	0	0
Total	3	0	0
Kho Kho World Cup
Gold medal – first place	2025 New Delhi	
Asian Championship
Gold medal – first place	2016 Indore	
Gold medal – first place	2023 Assam	

The India women's national kho kho team represents India in international women's Kho Kho competitions. Governed by the Kho Kho Federation of India (KKFI), it is a member of the International Kho Kho Federation (IKKF). India hosted the first Kho Kho World Cup and won the inaugural women's title, winning all six of its matches and beating Nepal 78–40 in the final in New Delhi. The team has also won the women's title at the Asian Kho Kho Championship in 2016 and 2023.

== History ==
=== Asian Championship (2016–2023) ===
Women's teams were first included in the Asian Kho Kho Championship at the third edition in Indore in 2016, where three teams competed; India won the title, with Bangladesh as runner-up and Nepal third. In the fourth edition in Assam in March 2023, with eight women's teams taking part, India won again, with Nepal as runner-up and Bangladesh third.

=== 2025 Kho Kho World Cup ===
The inaugural Kho Kho World Cup was held at the Indira Gandhi Indoor Stadium in New Delhi from 13 to 19 January 2025, with 20 men's and 19 women's teams. The KKFI named a 15-member squad captained by Priyanka Ingle.

India won all three group matches, beating South Korea (175–18), Iran (100–16) and Malaysia (100–20), then beat Bangladesh 109–16 in the quarter-final and South Africa 66–16 in the semi-final. In the final on 19 January, India beat Nepal 78–40 to lift the trophy, completing a double with the men's team.

=== Since the World Cup ===
The Odisha state government began sponsoring the national kho kho teams in January 2025 for three years. Commonwealth Sport approved India to host the first Commonwealth Kho Kho Championship from 9 to 14 March 2026, with 16 men's and 16 women's teams expected. The next World Cup is scheduled for 2027 in Birmingham, England.

== Governing body ==
The Kho Kho Federation of India (KKFI) is the national governing body for kho kho and organises the Senior National Kho Kho Championship, from which national squads are selected. The 58th edition began in Kazipet, Telangana, in January 2026 with more than 1,400 athletes from 79 teams across the men's and women's categories. The KKFI is led by president Sudhanshu Mittal.

== Tournament history ==
=== Kho Kho World Cup ===
India has won the only women's World Cup held to date.

Kho Kho World Cup
Year	Host city	Position
2025	New Delhi, India	(gold) 1st
2027	Birmingham, England	To be determined

Kho Kho World Cup record
Year	Result	Position	Pld	W	D*	L
(India) 2025	Champion	1st place, gold medalist(s)	6	6	0	0
Total	1/1	1 Title	6	6	0	0

=== Asian Kho Kho Championship ===
India has won both editions of the women's tournament.

Asian Kho Kho Championship
Year	Host	Position	Runner-up
2016	Indore, India	(gold) 1st	Bangladesh
2023	Assam, India	(gold) 1st	Nepal

== Recent results and fixtures ==
=== 2025 match results ===
Competition	Date	Round	Opponent	Score	Venue
World Cup	14 January 2025	Group stage	South Korea	175–18	Indira Gandhi Indoor Stadium, New Delhi
World Cup	15 January 2025	Group stage	Iran	100–16	Indira Gandhi Indoor Stadium, New Delhi
World Cup	16 January 2025	Group stage	Malaysia	100–20	Indira Gandhi Indoor Stadium, New Delhi
World Cup	17 January 2025	Quarter-final	Bangladesh	109–16	Indira Gandhi Indoor Stadium, New Delhi
World Cup	18 January 2025	Semi-final	South Africa	66–16	Indira Gandhi Indoor Stadium, New Delhi
World Cup	19 January 2025	Final	Nepal	78–40	Indira Gandhi Indoor Stadium, New Delhi

== 2025 World Cup squad ==
The following 15 players represented India at the first Kho Kho World Cup in January 2025.

No.	Name	Date of birth	Position	State
10	Anshu Kumari	30 January 2008	All rounder	Delhi
55	Ashwini Appasaheb Shinde	10 October 2007	Defender	Maharashtra
9	Opinaben Devjibhai Bhilar	8 July 2001	All rounder	Gujarat
4	Chaithra B.	8 January 2002	Defender	Karnataka
3	Magai Majhi	18 August 2004	Attacker	Odisha
36	Meenu Dhatterwal	23 November 2006	Defender	Haryana
11	Monika Sah		All rounder	Bihar
7	Nasreen Shaikh	7 November 1998	All rounder	Delhi
18	Nazia Bibi		Attacker	Jammu and Kashmir
	Neeta Devi		Wazir*	Himachal Pradesh
	Nirmala Bhati		Wazir	Rajasthan
6	Priyanka Hanumant Ingle (c)	3 October 2000	All rounder	Maharashtra
66	Reshma Subhash Rathod	31 December 2001	All rounder	Maharashtra
4	Subhashree Sing	19 April 2006	All rounder	Odisha
5	Vaishnavi Bajarang Powar	2 September 2006	Defender	Maharashtra

*Wazir is a chasing player who wears a different colour jersey than their teammates.

Standby: Sampada More, Ritika Siloriya and Priyanka Bhopi.

== Coaching staff ==
Position	Name	Ref.
Team manager	(India) Rajkumari	
Head coach	(India) Sumit Bhatia	
Assistant coach	(India) Munni Joon	
Defence coach	(India) Sushma Golwalkar	
Attack coach	(India) Prachi Waikar	
Skill analyst	(India) Eslavath Naresh	
Physios	(India) Amit Ravhate (India) Vandana (India) Kumkum	

== Training facilities ==
Ahead of the 2025 World Cup the national squads trained at a month-long camp at the Sports Authority of India JLN Stadium in New Delhi.

== Sponsorship ==
The Indian national kho kho teams are sponsored by the Odisha state government for three years from January 2025 to December 2027, with Rs 5 crore committed per year (Rs 15 crore in total).

== Honours ==
=== World ===
- Kho Kho World Cup:
  - Champions (1): 2025

=== Asia ===
- Asian Kho Kho Championship:
  - Champions (2): 2016, 2023

== Players ==
=== Captains ===
Priyanka Ingle, an all-rounder from Maharashtra, captained India at the 2025 World Cup.

== See also ==
- India men's national kho kho team
- Kho Kho World Cup
- Asian Kho Kho Championship
- Kho Kho Federation of India
- Ultimate Kho Kho
- India women's national kabaddi team
