= Iran men's national kho kho team =

Iranian men's kho kho team

Iran
- Association: Kho Kho Federation of Iran
- Confederation: International Kho Kho Federation (IKKF)

World Cup
- Appearances: 1 (first in 2025)
- Best result: Semi-finals (2025)

The Iran men's national kho kho team represents Iran in international men's Kho Kho competitions. It is governed by the Kho Kho Federation of Iran and is a member of the International Kho Kho Federation (IKKF). Iran reached the semi-finals of the 2025 Kho Kho World Cup, its only World Cup appearance to date, where it lost to Nepal.

== History ==
=== 2025 Kho Kho World Cup ===
Iran entered the inaugural Kho Kho World Cup, held at the Indira Gandhi Indoor Stadium in New Delhi from 13 to 19 January 2025, and was placed in Group B. It won all four of its group matches, beating Argentina (117–14), the Netherlands (142–22), Ghana (61–30) and South Africa (56–32), and finished top of the group.

In the quarter-final Iran beat Kenya 86–18. In the semi-final on 18 January it lost 72–20 to Nepal, who went on to reach the final. Iran's women's team had also reached the quarter-final stage, where they lost to Nepal 103–8.

== Tournament history ==
=== Kho Kho World Cup ===
Kho Kho World Cup
Year	Host city	Position
2025	New Delhi, India	Semi-finals

Kho Kho World Cup record
Year	Result	Position	Pld	W	D*	L
(Iran) 2025	Semi-finals	Top 4	6	5	0	1
Total	1/1	0 Titles	6	5	0	1

== Recent results and fixtures ==
=== 2025 match results ===
Competition	Date	Round	Opponent	Score	Venue
World Cup	14 January 2025	Group B	Argentina	117–14	Indira Gandhi Indoor Stadium, New Delhi
World Cup	15 January 2025	Group B	Netherlands	142–22	Indira Gandhi Indoor Stadium, New Delhi
World Cup	16 January 2025	Group B	Ghana	61–30	Indira Gandhi Indoor Stadium, New Delhi
World Cup	16 January 2025	Group B	South Africa	56–32	Indira Gandhi Indoor Stadium, New Delhi
World Cup	17 January 2025	Quarter-final	Kenya	86–18	Indira Gandhi Indoor Stadium, New Delhi
World Cup	18 January 2025	Semi-final	Nepal	20–72	Indira Gandhi Indoor Stadium, New Delhi

== See also ==
- Iran women's national kho kho team
- Nepal men's national kho kho team
- Kho Kho World Cup
- International Kho Kho Federation
