= India national kho kho team =

India national kho kho team may refer to:

- India men's national kho kho team
- India women's national kho kho team
