= Kho Kho Federation of India =

Sports governing body in India

- Sport: Kho kho
- Jurisdiction: India
- Abbreviation: KKFI
- Founded: 1955; 71 years ago
- Affiliation: International Kho Kho Federation
- Affiliation date: 2018
- Regional affiliation: Asian Kho Kho Federation
- President: Sudhanshu Mittal
- Vice presidents: Bhanwar Singh Palada; Rani Tiwari; M. Seetha Rami Reddy; Lokeshwara
- Secretary: M S Tyagi
- Men's coach: Ashwani Kumar Sharma
- Women's coach: Sumit Bhatia
- Replaced: Akhil Bharatiya Kho Kho Mandal

Official website
- khokhofederation.in
- Other key staff: Surender Kumar Bhutiyani (Treasurer); Upkar Singh Virk (Joint Secretary); Dr. Chandrajit Bhalchandra Jadhav (Joint Secretary); Sanjay Yadav (Joint Secretary); A Nelson Samuel (Joint Secretary)
- (India)

The Kho Kho Federation of India, aka KKFI, is the national governing body for kho-kho in India. Its president is Sudhanshu Mittal.

== History ==
KKFI, which was originally named Akhil Bharatiya Kho Kho Mandal, was started in 1955, and hosted its first competition in 1959. All state associations of the country are affiliated to the National Federation which conducts the National championship for men, women and junior classes every year. The 2024 National Kho Kho Championship was held in Delhi, and was won by Maharashtra in both the men and women categories.

Ultimate Kho Kho (UKK), a franchise-based Indian kho-kho league, is hosted in collaboration with KKFI, with KKFI having chosen the players for the initial season's draft. Several changes were made to the format of kho-kho played in UKK by KKFI, with an overall goal of modernising the sport. KKFI has also changed kho-kho at the national level, where the game is now played on matted surfaces.

KKFI has targeted Northeast India as a place for potential expansion of kho-kho, and is aiming to add a UKK team in the region. It is also involved in promoting kho-kho internationally in order to get it included in the Asian Games and the 2032 Olympics, and collaborated with the Kho Kho Federation of England to organise an International Kho Kho Cup in 2018. KKFI also organised the 4th edition of the Asian Kho Kho Championship in 2023, and hosted the inaugural Kho Kho World Cup in 2025 with the backing of the Indian Olympic Association.

== Events ==
- 56th National Kho Kho Championship 2024 - https://khokhofederation.in/news-details/?id=974
- 38th Junior National Kho-Kho Championship 2018 - https://khokhofederation.in/news-details/?id=510
- National Games of India - Khelo India Youth Games

== National award recipients ==
Year	Recipient	Award	Gender
1970	Sudhir B. Parab	Arjuna Award	Male
1971	Achala Suberao Devra	Arjuna Award	Male
1973	Bhavna H. Parikh	Arjuna Award	Female
1974	N. C. Sarolkar	Arjuna Award	Female
1975	Shreerang J. Inamdar	Arjuna Award	Male
1975	Usha Vasant Nagarkar	Arjuna Award	Female
1976	S. R. Dharwadkar	Arjuna Award	Male
1981	Sushma Sarolkar	Arjuna Award	Female
1981	H. M. Takalkar	Arjuna Award	Male
1983	Veena Narayan Parab	Arjuna Award	Female
1984	S. Prakash	Arjuna Award	Male
1985	S. B. Kulkarni	Arjuna Award	Female
1998	Shobha Narayan	Arjuna Award	Female
2020	Kale Sarika Sudhakar	Arjuna Award	Female
2000	Gopal Purushottam Phadke	Dronacharya Award	Male
