= Sarika Kale =

Indian kho kho sportswoman

Sarikaa Kale and Kishan katariya
- Born: Umbre Kota village, Osmanabad district, Maharashtra, India
- Occupation: Kho-Kho player
- Years active: 2006–present
- Known for: Captain of India women's national kho kho team
- Awards: Shiv Chhatrapati Award (2016); Arjuna Award (2020)

Sarika Kale is an Indian kho kho player from Maharashtra. She became the captain of the Maharashtra women's state kho kho team in 2010, leading the team to three national championships. Selected for the India women's national kho kho team in 2015, she was named captain of the team before the 2016 South Asian Games. She led the team to victory in the South Asian Games and in the Third Asian Kho-Kho Championship, where she received the match winner award in the final against Bangladesh.

Coming from a poor family in the Osmanabad district, Kale struggled financially for years due to unemployment. Her achievements in kho kho have been recognised by the Government of Maharashtra and the Government of India. She was the recipient of her state's Shiv Chhatrapati Award in 2016 and the Arjuna Award in 2020.

== Personal life ==
Kale was born in Umbre Kota village, Osmanabad district, Maharashtra. Hers was a very poor family and her father, mother, and grandmother made efforts to support her sporting career. She attended Shripatrao Bhosale High School in Osmanabad from first to twelfth grade, and attended Terna Mahavidyalaya in the city for her undergraduate programme. She received her postgraduate degree from Arts Science and Commerce College, Naldurg.

In 2016, she was struggling financially even as the captain of the national team and approached the Airports Authority of India for a job. She had also applied for a job in the Indian Railways in 2014 without success.

== Career ==
Kale developed interest in kho kho and started playing it at the age of 10. Kho kho is one of the popular traditional sports of India, played across the country. Kale was selected for the Maharashtra women's state kho kho team in 2006 and has participated in 25 different national championships and tournaments with the team. She became the captain of the state team in 2010 and led it to three national championships.

In 2015, Kale joined the national team of India and was named captain of the team in 2016. The India team won the gold medal at the 2016 South Asian Games, held at Guwahati. At the Third Asian Kho-Kho Championship at Indore in April 2016, her team defeated Bangladesh in the final match by a score of 26–16, with Kale winning the match winner award. She received a cash prize of ₹51,000 for her performance in the championship.

== Awards and honours ==
Kale has received numerous awards and recognition, including the Shiv Chhatrapati Award from the Government of Maharashtra. She was appointed Sports Officer of Tuljapur Tahsil after her success in the South Asian Games in 2016. In 2020, she received the Arjuna Award from the Government of India's Ministry of Youth Affairs and Sports in recognition of her achievements. She is the first woman athlete from the Marathwada region of Maharashtra to win the Arjuna Award, and the first kho kho player to win the award in 22 years; the last kho kho player to win the award was Shoba Narayan in 1998. Sudhanshu Mittal, the president of the Kho-Kho Federation of India, tweeted and called it a "greatest boost to indigenous games [in India]".
