= 2025 Kho Kho World Cup =

International Kho kho tournament

Tournament information
- Sport: Kho kho
- Dates: 13–19 January 2025
- Administrator: International Kho Kho Federation
- Format: Fast format
- Host: India
- Venue(s): Indira Gandhi Arena, New Delhi
- Participants: M: 20; W: 19
- Website: Website

Final positions
- Champions: M: India; W: India
- Runner-up: M: Nepal; W: Nepal

Tournament statistics
- Matches played: M: 47; W: 43
- Most points: M: Nepal (524); W: India (628)

The 2025 Kho Kho World Cup was the first edition of the Kho Kho World Cup. It was held at the Indira Gandhi Arena in New Delhi, India from 13 to 19 January 2025. The tournament was organized by the Kho Kho Federation of India and the International Kho Kho Federation.

India defeated Nepal in both the men's and women's competition to be crowned champions.

== Format ==
It was played under the seven-a-side fast format used for Ultimate Kho Kho. The teams were split into four groups, and there were two stages: the group stage, followed by the knockout stage.

=== Group Stage ===
- In the group stage of the men's tournament, teams were divided into four groups of five teams for the initial round-robin phase, with each team competing against others in their group to determine standings. A total of 40 matches were played in this stage.
- In the group stage of the women's tournament, teams were divided into four groups of five teams each (except in Group A) for the initial round-robin phase, with each team competing against others in their group to determine standings. A total of 36 matches were played in this stage.

=== Knockout Stage ===
- In the knockout stage of both men's and women's tournaments, the top two teams from each group advanced to the knockout stage, including quarter-finals, semi-finals, and the final match.

=== Prizes ===
There were no cash prizes, but the teams were honored with trophies, medals, and other recognitions.

== Background ==
The trophy and mascots for the inaugural edition were unveiled on 3 January 2025 at the Indira Gandhi Indoor Stadium. The blue trophy is for the men's competition while the green trophy is for the women's.

== Participants ==
The event witnessed the participation of 23 countries from six continents, featuring 20 men's and 19 women's teams. Each squad had 15 players, one coach, one manager and international technical officials.

Canada (men's team only) and Pakistan had been due to participate, but the Canadian team pulled out due to worsening Canada–India relations at the time, while the Pakistani team was not granted visas. In total, 35 countries sought to participate, but restrictions were in place to ensure continental balance.

=== Men's tournament ===
| Group A India Nepal Peru Brazil Bhutan | Group B South Africa Ghana Argentina Netherlands Iran | Group C Bangladesh Sri Lanka South Korea United States Poland | Group D England Germany Malaysia Australia Kenya |

=== Women's tournament ===
| Group A India South Korea Iran Malaysia Pakistan (Withdrew) | Group B England Australia Kenya Uganda Netherlands | Group C Nepal Bhutan Sri Lanka Germany Bangladesh | Group D South Africa New Zealand Poland Peru Indonesia |

== Men's league stage ==
=== Group A ===
| Pos | Team | Pld | W | L | T | PS | PL | PD | Pts | Qualification |
|---|---|---|---|---|---|---|---|---|---|---|
| 1 | India (H) | 4 | 4 | 0 | 0 | 249 | 143 | +106 | 12 | Advanced to the knockout stage |
| 2 | Nepal | 4 | 3 | 1 | 0 | 349 | 92 | +257 | 9 | Advanced to the knockout stage |
| 3 | Bhutan | 4 | 2 | 2 | 0 | 196 | 207 | -11 | 6 | |
| 4 | Peru | 4 | 1 | 3 | 0 | 139 | 274 | -135 | 3 | |
| 5 | Brazil | 4 | 0 | 4 | 0 | 90 | 307 | -217 | 0 | |

Source: KKWC 2025
(H) Host

13 January 2025
20:30 IST
Result

| India | 42–37 | Nepal |

India won by 5 points
Indira Gandhi Indoor Stadium, New Delhi

14 January 2025
12:30 IST
Result

| Peru | 24–90 | Bhutan |

Bhutan won by 66 points
Indira Gandhi Indoor Stadium, New Delhi

14 January 2025
18:30 IST
Result

| Nepal | 80–34 | Peru |

Nepal won by 46 points
Indira Gandhi Indoor Stadium, New Delhi

14 January 2025
20:15 IST
Result

| India | 66–34 | Brazil |

India won by 32 points
Indira Gandhi Indoor Stadium, New Delhi

15 January 2025
11:15 IST
Result

| Nepal | 134–8 | Brazil |

Nepal won by 126 points
Indira Gandhi Indoor Stadium, New Delhi

15 January 2025
15:15 IST
Result

| Brazil | 14–64 | Bhutan |

Bhutan won by 50 points
Indira Gandhi Indoor Stadium, New Delhi

15 January 2025
20:15 IST
Result

| India | 70–38 | Peru |

India won by 32 points
Indira Gandhi Indoor Stadium, New Delhi

16 January 2025
09:15 IST
Result

| Nepal | 98–8 | Bhutan |

Nepal won by 90 points
Indira Gandhi Indoor Stadium, New Delhi

16 January 2025
11:15 IST
Result

| Peru | 43–34 | Brazil |

Peru won by 9 points
Indira Gandhi Indoor Stadium, New Delhi

16 January 2025
20:15 IST
Result

| India | 71–34 | Bhutan |

India won by 37 points
Indira Gandhi Indoor Stadium, New Delhi

=== Group B ===
| Pos | Team | Pld | W | L | T | PS | PL | PD | Pts | Qualification |
|---|---|---|---|---|---|---|---|---|---|---|
| 1 | Iran | 4 | 4 | 0 | 0 | 376 | 96 | +280 | 12 | Advanced to the knockout stage |
| 2 | South Africa | 4 | 3 | 1 | 0 | 348 | 122 | +226 | 9 | Advanced to the knockout stage |
| 3 | Ghana | 4 | 2 | 2 | 0 | 184 | 232 | -48 | 6 | |
| 4 | Argentina | 4 | 1 | 3 | 0 | 172 | 295 | -123 | 3 | |
| 5 | Netherlands | 4 | 0 | 4 | 0 | 96 | 431 | -335 | 0 | |

Source: KKWC 2025

14 January 2025
10:30 IST
Result

| South Africa | 87–32 | Ghana |

South Africa won by 55 points
Indira Gandhi Indoor Stadium, New Delhi

14 January 2025
13:00 IST
Result

| Argentina | 14–117 | Iran |

Iran won by 103 points
Indira Gandhi Indoor Stadium, New Delhi

14 January 2025
16:30 IST
Result

| South Africa | 125–14 | Netherlands |

South Africa won by 111 points
Indira Gandhi Indoor Stadium, New Delhi

14 January 2025
19:45 IST
Result

| Ghana | 50–48 | Argentina |

Ghana won by 2 points
Indira Gandhi Indoor Stadium, New Delhi

15 January 2025
11:15 IST
Result

| Ghana | 74–36 | Netherlands |

Ghana won by 38 points
Indira Gandhi Indoor Stadium, New Delhi

15 January 2025
14:45 IST
Result

| South Africa | 104–20 | Argentina |

South Africa won by 84 points
Indira Gandhi Indoor Stadium, New Delhi

15 January 2025
17:15 IST
Result

| Netherlands | 22–142 | Iran |

Iran won by 120 points
Indira Gandhi Indoor Stadium, New Delhi

16 January 2025
08:45 IST
Result

| Ghana | 28–61 | Iran |

Iran won by 33 points
Indira Gandhi Indoor Stadium, New Delhi

16 January 2025
14:45 IST
Result

| Argentina | 90–24 | Netherlands |

Argentina won by 66 points
Indira Gandhi Indoor Stadium, New Delhi

16 January 2025
14:45 IST
Result

| South Africa | 32–56 | Iran |

Iran won by 24 points
Indira Gandhi Indoor Stadium, New Delhi

=== Group C ===
| Pos | Team | Pld | W | L | T | PS | PL | PD | Pts | Qualification |
|---|---|---|---|---|---|---|---|---|---|---|
| 1 | Bangladesh | 4 | 4 | 0 | 0 | 332 | 106 | +226 | 12 | Advanced to the knockout stage |
| 2 | Sri Lanka | 4 | 3 | 1 | 0 | 331 | 142 | +189 | 9 | Advanced to the knockout stage |
| 3 | United States | 4 | 1 | 2 | 1 | 205 | 294 | -89 | 4 | |
| 4 | South Korea | 4 | 1 | 2 | 1 | 171 | 302 | -131 | 4 | |
| 5 | Poland | 4 | 0 | 4 | 0 | 154 | 349 | -195 | 0 | |

Source: KKWC 2025

14 January 2025
11:15 IST
Result

| Bangladesh | 56–24 | Sri Lanka |

Bangladesh won by 32 points
Indira Gandhi Indoor Stadium, New Delhi

14 January 2025
14:45 IST
Result

| South Korea | 77–30 | Poland |

South Korea won by 47 points
Indira Gandhi Indoor Stadium, New Delhi

14 January 2025
17:15 IST
Result

| Bangladesh | 85–26 | United States |

Bangladesh won by 59 points
Indira Gandhi Indoor Stadium, New Delhi

15 January 2025
10:30 IST
Result

| Sri Lanka | 111–22 | United States |

Sri Lanka won by 89 points
Indira Gandhi Indoor Stadium, New Delhi

15 January 2025
12:30 IST
Result

| Bangladesh | 119–10 | South Korea |

Bangladesh won by 109 points
Indira Gandhi Indoor Stadium, New Delhi

15 January 2025
16:00 IST
Result

| United States | 95–36 | Poland |

USA won by 59 points
Indira Gandhi Indoor Stadium, New Delhi

15 January 2025
19:45 IST
Result

| Sri Lanka | 91–22 | South Korea |

Sri Lanka won by 69 points
Indira Gandhi Indoor Stadium, New Delhi

16 January 2025
10:00 IST
Result

| Sri Lanka | 105–42 | Poland |

Sri Lanka won by 63 points
Indira Gandhi Indoor Stadium, New Delhi

16 January 2025
15:15 IST
Result

| South Korea | 62–62 | United States |

Match tied
Indira Gandhi Indoor Stadium, New Delhi

16 January 2025
17:45 IST
Result

| Bangladesh | 72–46 | Poland |

Bangladesh won by 26 points
Indira Gandhi Indoor Stadium, New Delhi

=== Group D ===
| Pos | Team | Pld | W | L | T | PS | PL | PD | Pts | Qualification |
|---|---|---|---|---|---|---|---|---|---|---|
| 1 | England | 4 | 4 | 0 | 0 | 224 | 120 | +104 | 12 | Advanced to the knockout stage |
| 2 | Kenya | 4 | 3 | 1 | 0 | 209 | 160 | +49 | 9 | Advanced to the knockout stage |
| 3 | Australia | 4 | 2 | 2 | 0 | 233 | 152 | +81 | 6 | |
| 4 | Malaysia | 4 | 1 | 3 | 0 | 169 | 160 | +9 | 3 | |
| 5 | Germany | 4 | 0 | 4 | 0 | 80 | 323 | -243 | 0 | |

Source: KKWC 2025

14 January 2025
11:15 IST
Result

| England | 60–38 | Germany |

England won by 22 points
Indira Gandhi Indoor Stadium, New Delhi

14 January 2025
16:00 IST
Result

| Malaysia | 28–57 | Kenya |

Kenya won by 29 points
Indira Gandhi Indoor Stadium, New Delhi

14 January 2025
18:30 IST
Result

| England | 48–27 | Australia |

England won by 21 points
Indira Gandhi Indoor Stadium, New Delhi

15 January 2025
10:00 IST
Result

| Germany | 12–117 | Australia |

Australia won by 105 points
Indira Gandhi Indoor Stadium, New Delhi

15 January 2025
15:15 IST
Result

| England | 52–32 | Malaysia |

England won by 20 points
Indira Gandhi Indoor Stadium, New Delhi

15 January 2025
17:45 IST
Result

| Australia | 54–58 | Kenya |

Kenya won by 4 points
Indira Gandhi Indoor Stadium, New Delhi

16 January 2025
10:30 IST
Result

| Germany | 14–71 | Kenya |

Kenya won by 57 points
Indira Gandhi Indoor Stadium, New Delhi

16 January 2025
12:30 IST
Result

| Malaysia | 34–35 | Australia |

Australia won by 1 point
Indira Gandhi Indoor Stadium, New Delhi

16 January 2025
17:15 IST
Result

| England | 64–23 | Kenya |

England won by 41 points
Indira Gandhi Indoor Stadium, New Delhi

16 January 2025
19:45 IST
Result

| Germany | 16–75 | Malaysia |

Malaysia won by 59 points
Indira Gandhi Indoor Stadium, New Delhi

== Men's knockout stage ==
=== Bracket ===
Quarter-finals
17 January 2025
Iran | 86
Kenya | 18
17 January 2025
Bangladesh | 18
Nepal | 67
17 January 2025
England | 38
South Africa | 58
17 January 2025
India | 100
Sri Lanka | 40

Semi-finals
18 January 2025
Iran | 20
Nepal | 72
18 January 2025
South Africa | 42
India | 62

Final
19 January 2025
Nepal | 36
India | 54

=== Quarter-finals ===
Quarter-final 1

17 January 2025
11:45 IST
Result

| Iran | 86–18 | Kenya |

Iran won by 68 points
Indira Gandhi Indoor Stadium, New Delhi

Player of the match: Mehrab Moghadambaghe (Iran)

Quarter-final 2

17 January 2025
15:15 IST
Result

| England | 38–58 | South Africa |

South Africa won by 20 points
Indira Gandhi Indoor Stadium, New Delhi

Player of the match: Letlhogonolo Stork (South Africa)

Quarter-final 3

17 January 2025
17:45 IST
Result

| Bangladesh | 18–67 | Nepal |

Nepal won by 49 points
Indira Gandhi Indoor Stadium, New Delhi

Player of the match: Rajan Bal (Nepal)

Quarter-final 4

17 January 2025
20:15 IST
Result

| India | 100–40 | Sri Lanka |

India won by 60 points
Indira Gandhi Indoor Stadium, New Delhi

Player of the match: Ramji Kashyap (India)

=== Semi-finals ===
Semi-final 1

18 January 2025
17:45 IST
Result

| Iran | 20-72 | Nepal |

Nepal won by 52 points
Indira Gandhi Indoor Stadium, New Delhi

Player of the match: Janak Chand (Nepal)

Semi-final 2

18 January 2025
20:15 IST
Result

| South Africa | 42–62 | India |

India won by 20 points
Indira Gandhi Indoor Stadium, New Delhi

Player of the match: Gowtham MK (India)

=== Final ===
19 January 2025
20:15 IST
Result

| Nepal | 36–54 | India |

India won by 18 points
Indira Gandhi Indoor Stadium, New Delhi

Player of the match: Mehul (India)

== Women's league stage ==
=== Group A ===
| Pos | Team | Pld | W | L | T | PS | PL | PD | Pts | Qualification |
|---|---|---|---|---|---|---|---|---|---|---|
| 1 | India (H) | 3 | 3 | 0 | 0 | 375 | 54 | +321 | 9 | Advanced to the knockout stage |
| 2 | Iran | 3 | 2 | 1 | 0 | 167 | 138 | +39 | 6 | Advanced to the knockout stage |
| 3 | South Korea | 3 | 1 | 2 | 0 | 90 | 316 | -226 | 3 | |
| 4 | Malaysia | 3 | 0 | 3 | 0 | 80 | 204 | -124 | 0 | |

Source: KKWC 2025
(H) Host

14 January 2025
19:00 IST
Result

| India | 175–18 | South Korea |

India won by 157 points
Indira Gandhi Indoor Stadium, New Delhi

14 January 2025
19:45 IST
Result

| Iran | 54–16 | Malaysia |

Iran won by 38 points
Indira Gandhi Indoor Stadium, New Delhi

15 January 2025
19:00 IST
Result

| India | 100–16 | Iran |

India won by 84 points
Indira Gandhi Indoor Stadium, New Delhi

15 January 2025
19:45 IST
Result

| Malaysia | 44–50 | South Korea |

South Korea won by 6 points
Indira Gandhi Indoor Stadium, New Delhi

16 January 2025
16:00 IST
Result

| Iran | 97–22 | South Korea |

Iran won by 75 points
Indira Gandhi Indoor Stadium, New Delhi

16 January 2025
19:00 IST
Result

| India | 100–20 | Malaysia |

India won by 80 points
Indira Gandhi Indoor Stadium, New Delhi

=== Group B ===
| Pos | Team | Pld | W | L | T | PS | PL | PD | Pts | Qualification |
|---|---|---|---|---|---|---|---|---|---|---|
| 1 | Uganda | 4 | 3 | 1 | 0 | 274 | 60 | +183 | 9 | Advanced to the knockout stage |
| 2 | Kenya | 4 | 3 | 1 | 0 | 224 | 67 | +92 | 9 | Advanced to the knockout stage |
| 3 | England | 4 | 3 | 1 | 0 | 276 | 115 | +47 | 9 | |
| 4 | Australia | 4 | 1 | 3 | 0 | 128 | 176 | -126 | 3 | |
| 5 | Netherlands | 4 | 0 | 4 | 0 | 66 | 222 | -196 | 0 | |

Source: KKWC 2025

14 January 2025
11:45 IST
Result

| England | 81–30 | Australia |

England won by 51 points
Indira Gandhi Indoor Stadium, New Delhi

14 January 2025
15:15 IST
Result

| Kenya | 119–16 | Netherlands |

Kenya won by 103 points
Indira Gandhi Indoor Stadium, New Delhi

14 January 2025
17:45 IST
Result

| England | 30–45 | Uganda |

Uganda won by 15 points
Indira Gandhi Indoor Stadium, New Delhi

15 January 2025
10:00 IST
Result

| Australia | 20–95 | Uganda |

Uganda won by 75 points
Indira Gandhi Indoor Stadium, New Delhi

15 January 2025
12:30 IST
Result

| England | 51–40 | Kenya |

England won by 11 points
Indira Gandhi Indoor Stadium, New Delhi

15 January 2025
16:00 IST
Result

| Uganda | 103–10 | Netherlands |

Uganda won by 92 points
Indira Gandhi Indoor Stadium, New Delhi

16 January 2025
10:00 IST
Result

| Australia | 64–32 | Netherlands |

Australia won by 32 points
Indira Gandhi Indoor Stadium, New Delhi

16 January 2025
11:15 IST
Result

| Kenya | 46–31 | Uganda |

Kenya won by 15 points
Indira Gandhi Indoor Stadium, New Delhi

16 January 2025
16:00 IST
Result

| England | 114–8 | Netherlands |

England won by 106 points
Indira Gandhi Indoor Stadium, New Delhi

16 January 2025
17:15 IST
Result

| Australia | 14–73 | Kenya |

Kenya won by 59 points
Indira Gandhi Indoor Stadium, New Delhi

=== Group C ===
| Pos | Team | Pld | W | L | T | PS | PL | PD | Pts | Qualification |
|---|---|---|---|---|---|---|---|---|---|---|
| 1 | Nepal | 4 | 4 | 0 | 0 | 349 | 92 | +257 | 12 | Advanced to the knockout stage |
| 2 | Bangladesh | 4 | 3 | 1 | 0 | 320 | 97 | +2 | 9 | Advanced to the knockout stage |
| 3 | Sri Lanka | 4 | 2 | 2 | 0 | 172 | 75 | -61 | 6 | |
| 4 | Bhutan | 4 | 1 | 3 | 0 | 115 | 83 | -59 | 3 | |
| 5 | Germany | 4 | 0 | 4 | 0 | 76 | 73 | -39 | 0 | |

Source: KKWC 2025

14 January 2025
10:00 IST
Result

| Nepal | 83–24 | Bhutan |

Nepal won by 59 points
Indira Gandhi Indoor Stadium, New Delhi

14 January 2025
12:30 IST
Result

| Sri Lanka | 14–79 | Bangladesh |

Bangladesh won by 65 points
Indira Gandhi Indoor Stadium, New Delhi

14 January 2025
16:00 IST
Result

| Nepal | 73–34 | Germany |

Nepal won by 39 points
Indira Gandhi Indoor Stadium, New Delhi

15 January
11:45 IST
Result

| Bhutan | 66–22 | Germany |

Bhutan won by 44 points
Indira Gandhi Indoor Stadium, New Delhi

15 January 2025
14:45 IST
Result

| Nepal | 110–10 | Sri Lanka |

Nepal won by 100 points
Indira Gandhi Indoor Stadium, New Delhi

15 January 2025
18:30 IST
Result

| Germany | 18–105 | Bangladesh |

Bangladesh won by 87 points
Indira Gandhi Indoor Stadium, New Delhi

16 January 2025
08:45 IST
Result

| Bhutan | 6–112 | Bangladesh |

Bangladesh won by 106 points

16 January 2025
13:00 IST
Result

| Sri Lanka | 80–2 | Germany |

Sri Lanka won by 78 points
Indira Gandhi Indoor Stadium, New Delhi

16 January 2025
16:30 IST
Result

| Nepal | 83–24 | Bangladesh |

Nepal won by 59 points
Indira Gandhi Indoor Stadium, New Delhi

16 January 2025
19:45 IST
Result

| Bhutan | 19–65 | Sri Lanka |

Sri Lanka won by 46 points
Indira Gandhi Indoor Stadium, New Delhi

=== Group D ===
| Pos | Team | Pld | W | L | T | PS | PL | PD | Pts | Qualification |
|---|---|---|---|---|---|---|---|---|---|---|
| 1 | South Africa | 4 | 4 | 0 | 0 | 347 | 44 | +111 | 12 | Advanced to the knockout stage |
| 2 | New Zealand | 4 | 3 | 1 | 0 | 248 | 56 | -30 | 9 | Advanced to the knockout stage |
| 3 | Peru | 4 | 2 | 2 | 0 | 144 | 99 | -81 | 6 | |
| 4 | Poland | 4 | 1 | 3 | 0 | 130 | 58 | +2 | 3 | |
| 5 | Indonesia | 4 | 0 | 4 | 0 | 148 | 60 | -2 | 0 | |

Source: KKWC 2025

14 January 2025
10:00 IST
Result

| South Africa | 56–26 | New Zealand |

South Africa won by 30 points
Indira Gandhi Indoor Stadium, New Delhi

14 January 2025
14:45 IST
Result

| Poland | 60–58 | Indonesia |

Poland won by 2 points
Indira Gandhi Indoor Stadium, New Delhi

14 January 2025
17:15 IST
Result

| South Africa | 99–18 | Peru |

South Africa won by 81 points
Indira Gandhi Indoor Stadium, New Delhi

15 January 2025
13:00 IST
Result

| New Zealand | 66–26 | Peru |

New Zealand won by 40 points
Indira Gandhi Indoor Stadium, New Delhi

15 January 2025
16:30 IST
Result

| South Africa | 78–2 | Poland |

South Africa won by 76 points
Indira Gandhi Indoor Stadium, New Delhi

15 January 2025
18:30 IST
Result

| Peru | 50–48 | Indonesia |

Peru won by 2 points
Indira Gandhi Indoor Stadium, New Delhi

16 January 2025
11:45 IST
Result

| New Zealand | 82–30 | Indonesia |

New Zealand won by 52 points
Indira Gandhi Indoor Stadium, New Delhi

16 January 2025
12:30 IST
Result

| Poland | 42–50 | Peru |

Peru won by 8 points
Indira Gandhi Indoor Stadium, New Delhi

16 January 2025
18:30 IST
Result

| New Zealand | 72–26 | Poland |

New Zealand won by 46 points
Indira Gandhi Indoor Stadium, New Delhi

16 January
18:30 IST
Result

| South Africa | 114–12 | Indonesia |

South Africa won by 102 points
Indira Gandhi Indoor Stadium, New Delhi

== Women's knockout stage ==
=== Bracket ===
Quarter-finals
17 January 2025
Uganda | 71
New Zealand | 26
17 January 2025
Nepal | 103
Iran | 8
17 January 2025
South Africa | 51
Kenya | 46
17 January 2025
India | 109
Bangladesh | 16

Semi-finals
18 January 2025
Uganda | 18
Nepal | 89
18 January 2025
South Africa | 16
India | 66

Final
19 January 2025
Nepal | 40
India | 78

=== Quarter-finals ===
Quarter-final 1

17 January 2025
10:30 IST
Result

| Uganda | 71–26 | New Zealand |

Uganda won by 45 points
Indira Gandhi Indoor Stadium, New Delhi

Player of the match: Ojil Grace (Uganda)

Quarter-final 2

17 January 2025
13:00 IST
Result

| South Africa | 51–46 | Kenya |

South Africa won by 5 points
Indira Gandhi Indoor Stadium, New Delhi

Player of the match: Londeka Mkhwanazi (South Africa)

Quarter-final 3

17 January 2025
16:30 IST
Result

| Nepal | 103–8 | Iran |

Nepal won by 95 points
Indira Gandhi Indoor Stadium, New Delhi

Player of the match: Saraswoti Kadayat (Nepal)

Quarter-final 4

17 January 2025
19:00 IST
Result

| India | 109–16 | Bangladesh |

India won by 93 points
Indira Gandhi Indoor Stadium, New Delhi

Player of the match: Ashwani Shinde (India)

=== Semi-finals ===
Semi-final 1

18 January 2025
16:30 IST
Result

| Uganda | 18–89 | Nepal |

Nepal won by 71 points
Indira Gandhi Indoor Stadium, New Delhi

Player of the match: Puja Odd (Nepal)

Semi-final 2

18 January 2025
19:00 IST
Result

| South Africa | 16–66 | India |

India won by 50 points
Indira Gandhi Indoor Stadium, New Delhi

Player of the match: Vaishnavi Bajrang (India)

=== Final ===
19 January 2025
19:00 IST
Result

| Nepal | 40–78 | India |

India won by 38 points
Indira Gandhi Indoor Stadium, New Delhi

Player of the match: Chaithra B (India)
