= Glossary of kho kho terms =

This is a glossary of kho kho terminology.

== Legend ==
- UKK: Indicates that a concept originates from rule changes propagated by the Ultimate Kho Kho league.

== A ==
=== Attacker ===
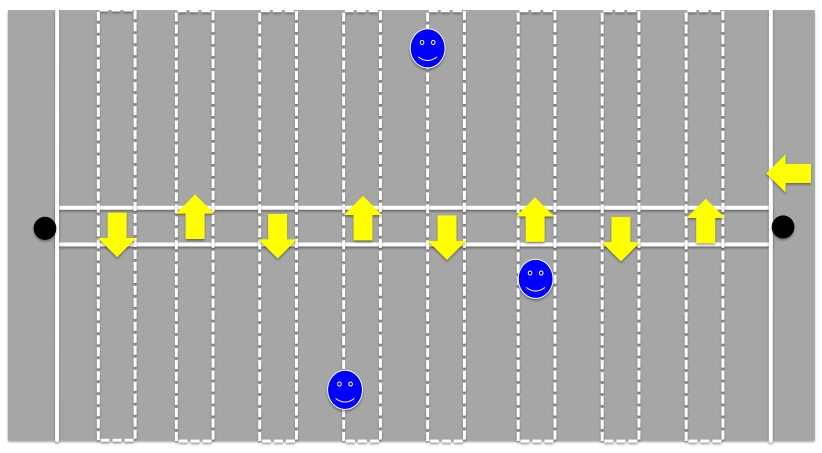
The yellow arrows represent the attackers, with the active attacker in the far right

An attacker, also known as a chaser, is a player on the offensive team. One attacker (sometimes referred to as the "active chaser") is allowed to run around the field and tag defenders while the other attackers are inactive and sit.

=== Attacker block ===
The attacker blocks, also known as sitting blocks, are the areas that all but one of the attackers sit in.

== B ==
=== Batch ===
Defenders enter the game in groups of three known as "batches". Once all three members of a batch have been dismissed, the next batch enters the court.

=== Boundary Out ===
A boundary out is a method of dismissal which occurs when a defender steps out of the field with no part of the body remaining grounded within the field.

== C ==
=== Central lane ===
The central lane is the area between both poles which contains the sitting blocks that the attackers sit in.

It is against the rules for an attacker to tag a defender while in the central lane, with the exception of an attacker who has received a kho and not yet left their sitting block.

=== Chaser ===
See Attacker.

=== Cross lane ===
Cross lanes are areas of the field that are drawn by creating lanes from one end of the field to the other that have the width of and pass through each of the attacker blocks.

When a sitting attacker becomes active, they are considered to have chosen a direction once they step on either side of the cross lane they are in.

For a kho to be valid, it must be given before an attacker has gone beyond the cross lane that his sitting teammate is within.

== D ==
=== Dismiss ===
When a defender is tagged out or otherwise eliminated from the game, they are said to have 'gotten out'/'been dismissed', with a "dismissal" having occurred.

=== Dive ===
See sky dive and pole dive.

=== Dream Run ===
(UKK) When at least one defender from a batch remains undismissed for at least 3 minutes, then their team scores 1 point, with an additional point scored for every 30 seconds that the batch survives afterward.

== F ==
=== Foul ===
A foul occurs when the attacking team commits a violation of the rules; until the foul has been cleared, the attacking team is not allowed to tag any defenders. Fouls are cleared by the attacker disengaging from their pursuit of the defenders, running in the opposite direction, and then either giving a kho to a teammate or reaching the free zone.

== K ==
=== Kho ===
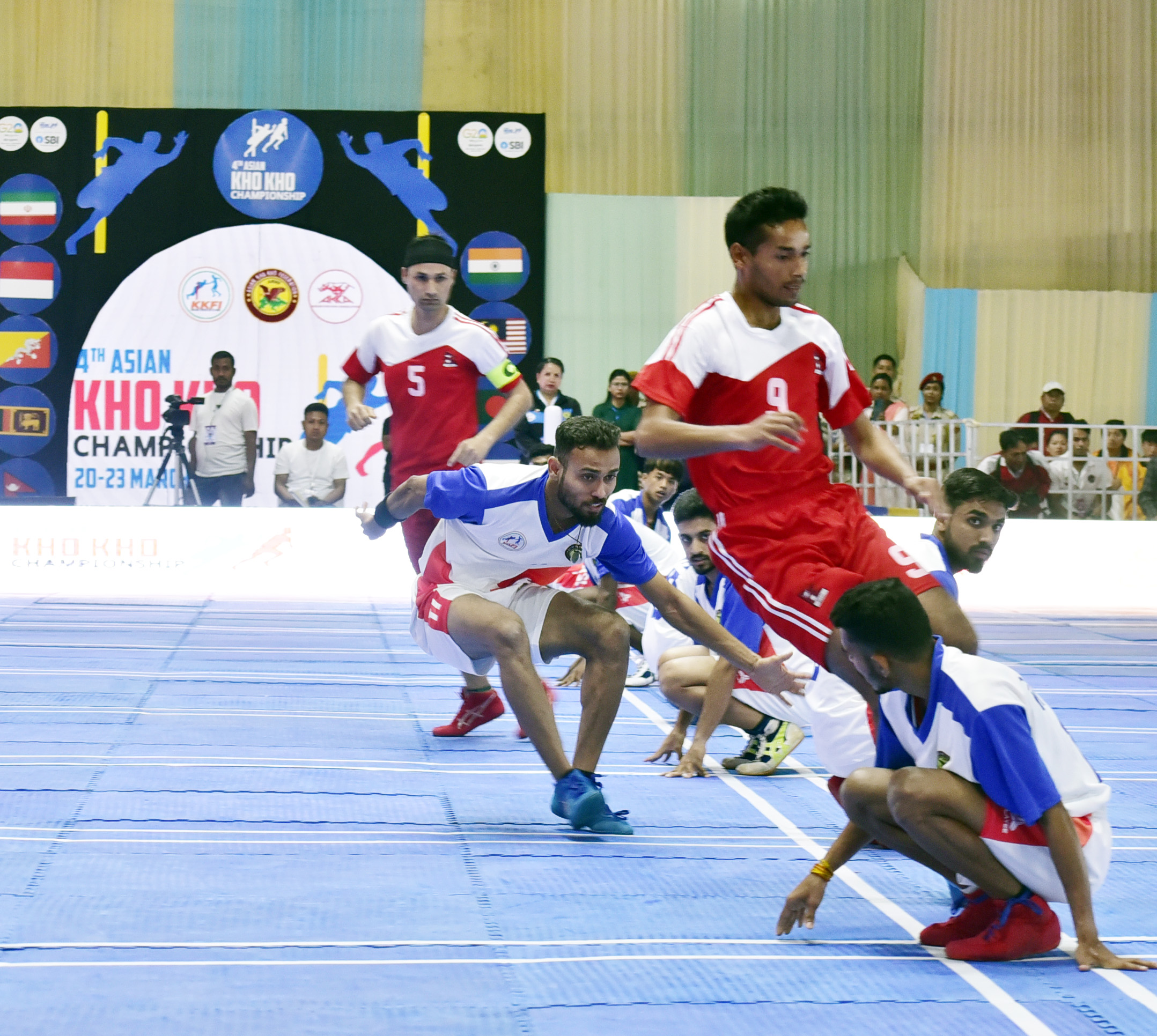
An attacker (blue) touching a sitting teammate's back, aiming to get the defender (front red) who is entering the other half

A kho is said to have been given by an attacker to a sitting teammate when the attacker touches the back of their teammate and says "kho", with the two players thus switching roles. A foul occurs if the kho is not given validly.

== L ==
=== Lobby ===
The immediate area around the playing field.

== M ==
=== Minimum chase ===
A minimum chase is a type of tiebreaker in which each team gets one additional turn to score. Each team's turn lasts until they have scored one point, with the team that is faster at scoring winning. If the tie persists, additional minimum chase turns are played.

== O ==
=== Out ===
See dismiss.

== P ==
=== Pole dive ===

A pole dive is executed by an attacker by the attacker attempting to tag a defender with one arm outstretched while the other arm grips a pole.

=== Powerplay ===
(UKK) The powerplay is a period of time during which the attacking team is allowed to have two wazirs. Powerplays can only begin once a new batch of defenders enters the court, with the powerplay ending upon the dismissal of the batch. The attacking team can take one powerplay in each of its turns.

== R ==
=== Recede ===
An attacker is said to have receded, and thus committed a foul, when he retreads the ground that he had already covered after choosing a direction. (The "ground already covered" is considered to be the portion of the field behind the attacker's rear foot.)

However, it is not considered receding if the attacker's feet slide backwards while he is executing a pole dive or in the process of recovering from a sky dive, or if he has not yet chosen a direction and sets his feet on one side of the cross lane he is in so that he may more easily run towards the other side of the cross lane.

=== Running touch ===
A running touch occurs when an attacker tags a defender without diving.

== S ==
=== Self-Out ===
A self-out occurs when a defender allows themselves to be tagged out.

=== Shoulder line ===
The shoulder line is an imaginary line going through the shoulders of an attacker. For a kho to be valid, it must be given with the attacker touching a sitting teammate between the shoulder line and waist line.

If an attacker has chosen a direction, it is considered a foul for their shoulder line to face more than 90 degrees away from that direction.

=== Sitting block ===
See attacker block.

=== Sky dive ===
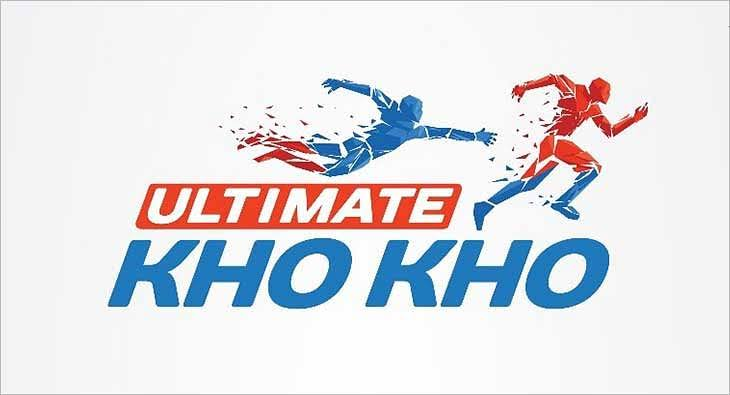
Ultimate Kho Kho logo depicting a diving tag

An attacker has executed a sky dive when he dives through the air in an attempt to tag a defender.

== T ==
=== Tag ===
A tag occurs when an attacker touches a defender using the palm of the hand. When an attacker dismisses a defender with a tag, the defender is said to have been "tagged out".

== U ==
=== Ultimate Kho Kho ===
Ultimate Kho Kho (UKK) is an Indian franchise-based kho-kho league that was started in 2022. It features several rule changes and innovations.

== W ==
=== Wazir ===
(UKK) A wazir is a specially designated attacker who is allowed to change directions.

=== Wicket ===
The term wicket is a sometimes-used synonym of dismissal; when an attacker dismisses a defender, it is stated that the attacker has taken the defender's wicket, with the defender having lost his wicket and the defending team having lost a wicket. (Note: The term wicket is borrowed from cricket.)
