= Gopal Purushottam Phadke =

Indian sports coach (died 2009)

- Born: Pune, Maharashtra, India
- Died: 20 October 2009; Pune, Maharashtra, India
- Resting place: Vaikunth crematorium, Pune; 18°30′28″N 73°50′28″E
- Occupation: Sports coach
- Known for: Kho Kho
- Children: Two sons
- Awards: Padma Shri; Dronacharya Award

Gopal Purushottam Phadke was an Indian sports coach from Pune, in the Indian state of Maharashtra. He was a specialist coach of kho kho, a sport of Indian origin as well as of other sports, such as swimming, Mallakhamb and Kabaddi.

After securing a diploma in engineering, he worked at the Maharashtra State Road Transport Corporation (MSRTC), but left the company to take up sports coaching as a full-time job. He was reported to have provided coaching to physically handicapped children in swimming using a custom-built tank constructed at his own expense and is credited with efforts in popularising the sport in other countries such as Australia. He was involved with Arya Krida Dharak Mandal, an organization which promoted kho kho and other sports and was a member of the advisory committees of All India Radio, Doordarshan and the selection committee of Dronacharya award.

He died on 20 October 2009 at his residence in Pune, succumbing to liver cirrhosis. He received the Dronacharya Award, the highest Indian award for sports coaching, in 2000, the only coach from the sport of kho kho to receive the award. A former vice president of the All India Association of Dronacharya Awardees, Phadke was honoured by the Government of India in 2003 with Padma Shri, the fourth highest Indian civilian award.

== See also ==
- Kho Kho
- Kabaddi
- Mallakhamb
