= Nepal Kho Kho Association =

Sports governing body in Nepal

- Sport: Kho kho
- Jurisdiction: (Nepal) National
- Abbreviation: NKKA
- Affiliation: International Kho Kho Federation
- President: Pradip Maharjan
- Secretary: Sankar Maharjan

Official website
- khokhonepal.com
- (Nepal)

The Nepal Kho Kho Association (NKKA) is the national governing body for kho-kho in Nepal. Its president is Pradip Maharjan. All state associations of the country are affiliated to the National Federation which conducts the National championship for men, women and junior classes every year. National Kho Kho Championship is the main Kho Kho tournament in Nepal Organizes by Nepal Kho Kho Association. Recently NKKA concluded first U-21 national men's and women's kho kho tournament in Dhangadi.

== Competitions ==
Major Competitions organizes by Nepal Kho Kho Association (NKKA):

- National Kho Kho Championship (Men and Women)
- National U-21 Kho Kho Championship (Men and Women)

== National Teams ==
- Nepal men's national kho kho team
- Nepal women's national kho kho team

== Affiliated Province Kho Kho Associations ==
Province Association	Province	Affiliate District Association	President
Bagmati Province Kho Kho Association	Bagmati	Bhaktapur District Kho Kho Association; Kathmandu District Kho Kho Association	
Gandaki Province Kho Kho Association	Gandaki	Kaski District Kho Kho Association	
Karnali Province Kho Kho Association	Karnali		
Koshi Province Kho Kho Association	Koshi		
Lumbini Province Kho Kho Association	Lumbini		Mr. Tul Bahadur Thapa
Madhesh Province Kho Kho Association	Madhesh		
Sudurpaschim Province Kho Kho Association	Sudurpashchim	Dhangadi District Kho Kho Association	

== Academies ==
- Kirtipur Kho Kho
- Bhaktapur Kho Kho
