= Hanuman Vyayam Prasarak Mandal =

Hanuman Vyam Prasarak Mandal
- HVPM (Maharashtra)

Location
- H.V.P. Mandal; Amravati; Vidharbha; Amravati, India, Maharashtra, 444 605; India
- Coordinates: 20°55′36.0966″N 77°44′26.9988″E

Information
- Religious affiliation: Hindu
- Established: 1914
- Founder: Anant Krishnarao Vaidya; Ambadaspant Vaidya
- Status: Registered under Bombay Public Trust Act 1950 and Societies Registration Act 1860
- School district: Amravati
- Area trustee: Dr. S.H. Deshpande
- Specialist: Degree College in Physical Education
- President: Adv. K. H. Deshpande
- Head of school: Commandant
- Campus size: 12 acres (0.049 km^{2})
- Campus type: Residential
- Slogan: आगे बढ़ो सबसे आगे बढ़ो !
- Song: NATIONAL ANTHEM OF INDIA
- Sports: Hockey, shooting, boxing, Football, Basketball, Volleyball, Horse Riding, Swimming, Handball etc.
- Accreditation: Sant Gadge Baba Amravati University
- Publication: Jotirmay (Annual magazine); Jyot (Weekly news paper); Sanstha Samachar (Annual report)
- Affiliation: Sant Gadge Baba Amravati University
- Website: http://www.hvpm.org/

Popularly known as HVPM, this is a premier institute in India for physical training. It was set up by Mr Anant Vaidya and Mr Ambadas Vaidya around 1914. Earlier it was referred as Hanuman Akhada. Many political leaders and freedom fighters have visited HVPM. It is said that Shivaram Rajguru studied at HVPM. During his hideout Chandrashekhar Azad also stayed here for few days. The HVPM demonstrated traditional Indian sports at the 1936 Olympics. The institution also has an engineering college in its campus run under the same management committee.
