= Sudhanshu Mittal =

Indian politician

President of Kho Kho Federation of India
- Incumbent
- Assumed office 2018
- Preceded by: Position Established

Personal details
- Born: 18 September 1959 (age 66) Delhi, India
- Party: BJP
- Spouse: Dr. Rubina Mittal

Sudhanshu Mittal is an Indian politician affiliated to the Bharatiya Janata Party (BJP), who later became the official spokesperson of the party. He was in the 1979 batch of the St. Xavier's School, Delhi. He completed his B.Com. from the Shri Ram College of Commerce (1982 batch) and was President of the Delhi University Students Union in 1981–82. Later, he took admission in the law college but dropped to support a family business.

== Politics ==
Mittal is a member and official spokesperson of BJP.

He was a confidant of Pramod Mahajan, a senior BJP leader who died in 2006. Although described as a top contender for the party's Chandni Chowk parliament seat, Mittal was not selected to contest it in the 2014 general elections.

== Sports ==
Mittal is a keen sportsman who excels in Badminton. Besides being Vice President of the India Olympic Association, he is also the President of Kho Kho Federation of India. He is credited with making kho kho an international game.
