= 2024 National Kho Kho Championship (India) =

National championship in India

- Venue: Indira Gandhi Indoor Stadium
- Location: New Delhi, India
- Date: 27 March - 1 April 2024

The 56th National Kho Kho Championship took place from 27 March to 1 April 2024 in New Delhi, India. The National championship is the top tournament in India, annually contested by the states, and the winner is declared as the National champion. Maharashtra won both the men's and women's titles in the 56th edition.

Kho kho, along with kabaddi are the two Indian traditional sports which are very popular in the country and the home grown sport are played for over thousand years. Besides cricket, the game has enjoyed good viewership, after the Ultimate kho kho league was introduced.

The kho kho National championships are organised by the Kho Kho Federation of India annually and the champion states are decided and awarded National titles in both men's and women's categories.

== Format ==
The champion teams were presented ₹3 lakh (US$3,500) each and the runners-up won ₹2 lakh (US$2,400) each.

== Men's edition ==
=== Playoffs ===
==== Semifinal 1 ====
Maharashtra beat Kolhapur 30–28.

==== Semifinal 2 ====
Railways beat Odisha 24–22.

==== Final ====
Maharashtra beat Railways 52-50 (match lasted three innings because first two innings were tied).

== Women's edition ==
=== Playoffs ===
==== Semifinal 1 ====
Maharashtra team defeated Odisha 24–20.

==== Semifinal 2 ====
Airport Authority of India defeated Delhi 32–10.

==== Final ====
Maharashtra beat Airport Authority of India 18–16.
