= Indian sports at the 1936 Summer Olympics =

Traditional sports of India were showcased as an exhibition alongside the 1936 Summer Olympics. It is known that the sports of kabaddi, kho kho and mallakhamba were demonstrated. A 35-member contingent from the Hanuman Vyayam Prasarak Mandal (HVPM) physical education institute demonstrated the events, and were not considered part of the official Indian team. The sports' inclusion was spearheaded by HVPM Vice President Dr. Siddhanath Kane, who successfully lobbied Olympic organizer Carl Diem for permission to exhibit them. Indian physical culture practices such as lezim and yoga were also performed.

The sports were not recognized as official demonstration sports by the International Olympic Committee. However, the contingent were awarded an honorary medal by Adolf Hitler, who was said to have been impressed by the displays.
