= Kho Kho Federation of England =

Governing body for the sport of Kho Kho in the United Kingdom

The Kho Kho Federation of England (KKFE) is the governing body for the sport of kho kho in the United Kingdom. Established in 2014 by Brij Haldania, the sport has seen a rise in popularity especially amongst the South Asian communities that reside in the UK. KKFE has a vision to take kho kho to the international platform, and organised international competitions involving India, England, and other countries in 2018. It is also promoting the sport by participating in TEAMS Europe.

KKFE held the first National Kho Kho Championship in 2015, where the Finchley Shakha Kho Kho Team were crowned champions.

- Wembley Kho Kho
- Leicester Kho Kho
- Sangh United Kho Kho
- North London Nighthawks
- North London Shakha
- NHSF Kingston University
- Woolwich Kho Kho
- Ashton All Stars
- East London Shakha
- Shishukunj Kho Kho

Kingston University became the first University Kho Kho team to be recognised by KKFE.

== See also ==
- Kabaddi in the United Kingdom
