= Mallakhamba =

Indian pole-related sport

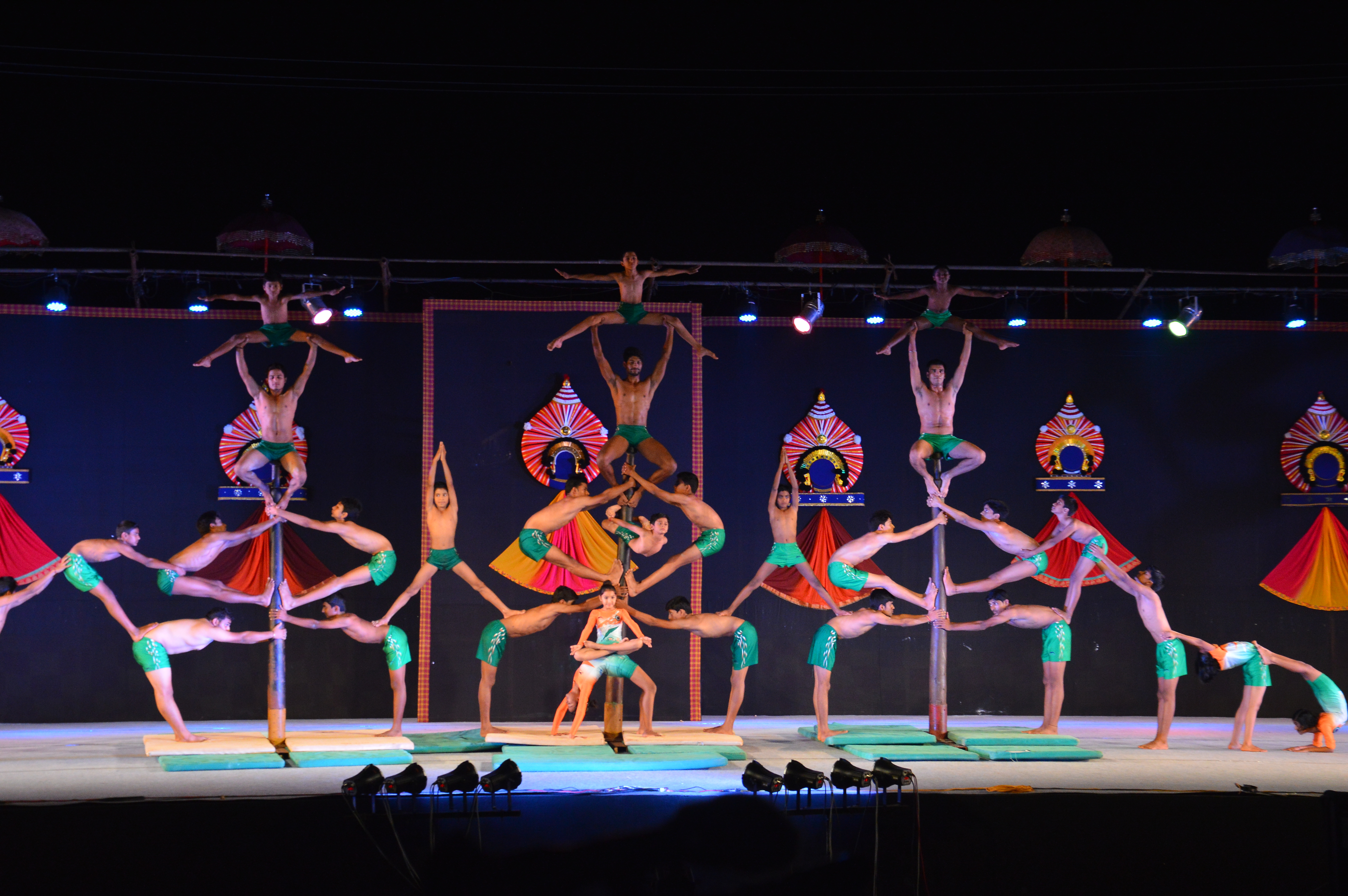
- A mallakhamba team performs on the pole, 2015
- Highest governing body: Mallakhamb Federation
- First played: c. 2nd century BCE

Characteristics
- Mixed-sex: Yes
- Type: Indoor or outdoor, gymnastics, pole sports
- Equipment: Wrestling grips, vertical pole

Presence
- Country or region: India
- Olympic: Demonstration sport: 1936

Mallakhamba, or Mallakhamb or Mallarkambam is a traditional sport, originating from the Indian subcontinent, in which a group of gymnasts perform aerial yoga and gymnastic postures using wrestling grips in concert with a stationary vertical pole. The word mallakhamba also refers to the pole used in the sport. The pole is usually made from shisham (Indian rosewood) polished with castor oil. Other popular versions of mallakhamba are practiced using a cane or a rope instead of a pole. The origins of pole dancing can be traced back to the sport of mallakhamba.

The name mallakhamba derives from the terms malla, meaning wrestler, and khamba, which means a pole. Literally meaning "wrestling pole", the term refers to a traditional training implement used by wrestlers.

On April 9, 2013, the Indian state of Madhya Pradesh declared mallakhamba to be an official state sport. By 2017, more than 20 other states in India had added it as one of their state sports.

== History ==
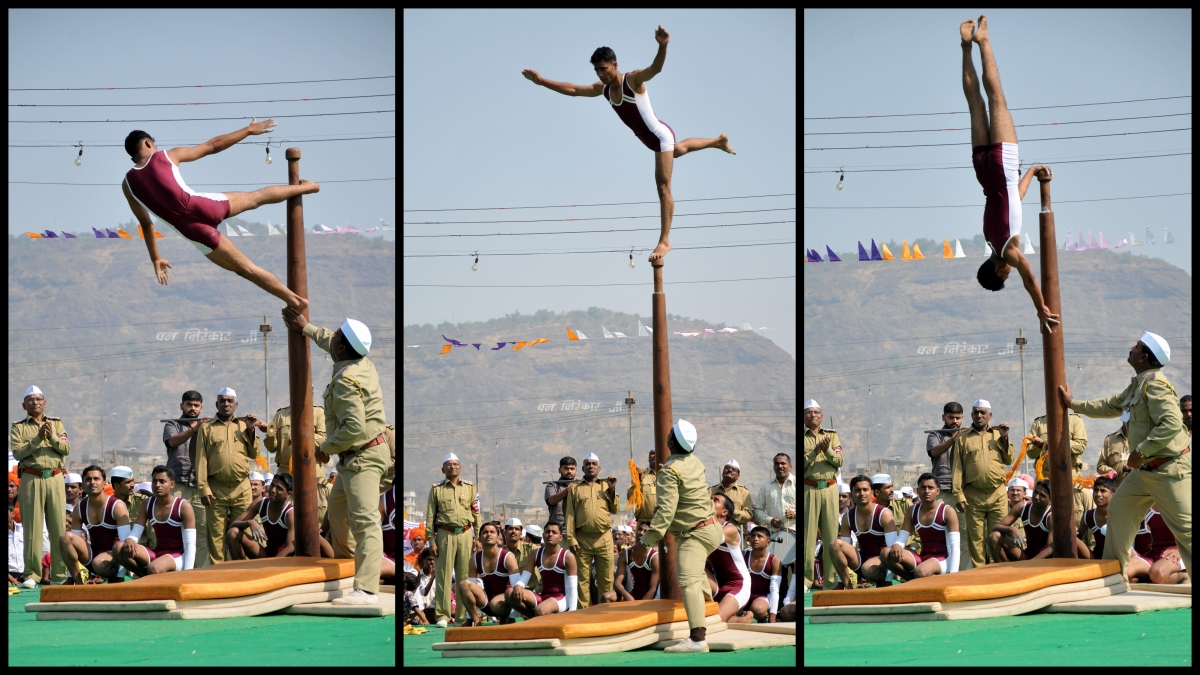
Performing mallakhamb

Early examples of mallakhamba are seen on Chandraketugarh pottery from between the 2nd century BCE and 1st century CE, where figures are shown exhibiting gymnastics by hanging on a pole like structure in the shape of a T which is held by another person. In 7th century CE, Chinese Buddhist pilgrim Xuanzhang provides evidence of pole climbing of the pillar cult which he witnessed at Prayagraj. Xuanzhang records that Hindu ascetics climbed the top of a pole situated at Prayagraj, clinging onto it with one hand and one foot, and watched the sunset with their heads turned to the right as it set, marking it as a type a solar rite. The earliest mention of mallakhamba in a literary work is in the 1135 CE Sanskrit classic Manasollasa, written by the Western Chalukya king Someshvara III. A Rajput painting from 1610 CE shows athletes performing various acrobatics, including pole climbing, while dancing to Raga Desahka. A Mughal painting from 1670 depicts athletes practicing club swinging, weightlifting, and pole climbing similar to mallakhamba.

Little mention of mallakhamba exists between the late 17th century to the late 18th century, until it received new interest from Balambhatta Dada Deodhar, the teacher of Peshwa Baji Rao II. During the first half of the 19th century, Lakshmibai, the Rani of Jhansi learned mallakhamba with her childhood friends Nana Saheb and Tantia Tope.

Mallakhamba was demonstrated at the 1936 Summer Olympics. Competitive mallakhamba made its first appearance in 1958 at the National Gymnastics Championships (NGCs) held at the Pahadganj Stadium, Delhi, India. The Gymnastics Federation of India (GFI) proposed to recognize the game and include it in subsequent NGCs. The first national mallakhamba championships were held in 1962 at Gwalior, Madhya Pradesh, as part of the NGCs. Around 1968, the game was introduced in the All-India Inter-University Gymnastics Championships. The national mallakhamba championships were organized annually by the GFI until 1976. In 1977, the mallakhamba championships were removed from the GFI, and no major championship games were held until 1980.

Bamshankar Joshi and other mallakhamba enthusiasts in Ujjain, Madhya Pradesh, founded an all-India level organization named the Mallakhamb Federation of India. The first all-India national mallakhamba championships were organized by the new sports association in 1981 from January 28 to 29 at Ujjain, Madhya Pradesh. The event brought in representatives from all over India. The national mallakhamba championships have since been organized by different state associations affiliated to this federation.

Competitively, there are three variations of mallakhamba which have been in practice since 1937:

1. Pole mallakhamba
2. Hanging mallakhamba
3. Rope mallakhamba

All variations are practiced by both men and women, though pole mallakhamba is more commonly practiced by men, and rope mallakhamba by women. All mallakhamba competitions are organized under the rules made by the Mallakhamb Federation of India, and 28 states are affiliated to the Federation. Himani Uttam Parab won gold medal in rope long set in the first World Mallakhamb Championship 2019.

== Variations and specifications ==
=== Pole mallakhamba ===
In this variation, a vertical wooden pole made of teak wood or sheesham is fixed to the ground. The pole is smeared with castor oil, which helps to minimize excessive friction. Participants perform various acrobatic feats and poses while hanging on the pole. Wrestlers mount, dismount, and utilize the pole for various complex calisthenics designed to develop their grip, stamina, and strength in the arms, legs, and upper body.

There are a number of different types of pole, although the most common is a free-standing upright pole, some eight to ten inches in diameter, planted into the ground. The pole used in competitions is a straight pole made of teak or sheesham wood, standing 2.6 metres (8.5 ft) in height with a circumference of 55 centimetres (22 in) at the base. It gradually tapers to a circumference of 35 centimetres (14 in) at the top.

The specifications of pole mallakhamba are as follows:

Range	Height (senior group)	Height (sub-junior group)
Note: All dimensions are in millimeters (mm)
Above the ground	2600 to 2800	2400 to 2600
Under the ground	800 to 900	700 to 800
Neck	180 to 200	180 to 200
Top	70	60
Total length	3400 to 3700	3100 to 3400
Circumference
Note: All dimensions are in millimeters (mm)
Bottom	530 to 550	480 to 500
Below the neck	300 to 350	300 to 350
Neck	180 to 200	180 to 200
Top	350	300

=== Hanging mallakhamba ===
This type of mallakhamba is similar to pole mallakhamba, but uses a shorten wooden pole shorter than the one used in pole mallakhamba. Instead of being planted into the ground, the pole is hung with hooks and a chain, leaving a gap between the ground and the bottom of the mallakhamba.

The specifications of hanging mallakhamba are as follows:

Range	Height
Note: All dimensions are in millimeters (mm)
	1700 to 1900
Neck height	180 to 200
Top height	70
Distance between bottom and ground	650 to 700
Height of the structure	4600 to 4800
Circumference
Note: All dimensions are in millimeters (mm)
Bottom	4500 to 5000
Neck	180 to 200
Below the neck	250 to 300

=== Rope mallakhamba ===
In this variation, the participants perform exercises while hanging on a rope suspended from a support at the top. The rope is typically 5.5 metres (18 ft) long, and approximately 1 to 2 centimetres (0.39 to 0.79 in) in diameter. The rope is caught by the performer in the gap between the big toe and the second toe, along with one or both hands. After climbing upwards on the rope, the performer ties the rope around the body through a sequence of steps. The performer then reaches various positions called Udi ("to fly"), some of which are imitations of standard asana.

Rope mallakhamba was historically performed on a piece of cane grass, but due to the lack of access to cane, a cotton rope is commonly used. Performers are expected to perform various exercises without knotting the rope in any way.

The specifications of rope mallakhamba are as follows:

Dimension	Measurement (Senior Group)	Measurement (Sub-Junior Group)
Note: All dimensions are in millimeters (mm)
Length	6000 to 6500	6000 to 6500
Thickness	18 to 20	12 to 13
Height of the structure	5800 to 6000	5800 to 6000

== Official international organizations ==
- Vishwa Mallakhamb Federation (VMF)
- Mallakhamb Confederation of World (MCW)
- Asian Mallakhamb Federation (AMF)
- South Asian Mallakhamb Federation (SAMF)
- Mallakhamb Federation USA (MFU)
- Mallakhamb Deutschland e.V. (Germany)

== Official Indian mallakhamb sport national organizations ==
- Mallakhamb Federation, widely known as Mallakhamb Federation of India (MFI), registered on 7 June 1984 with Registration No. 13752 in Ujjain, M.P. It is affiliated with Vishwa Mallakhamb Federation. In September 2022, The Times of India revealed that following allegations for sexual harassment and the failure to comply with the national sports code of India 2011, the MFI's recognition as a National Sports Federation was withdrawn and its annual financial grant stopped by the sports ministry.
- Mallakhamb Sports Federation of India (MSFI) has been affiliated with Mallakhamb Confederation of World (MCW), Asian Mallakhamb Federation (AMF), South Asian Mallakhamb Federation (SAMF).

=== Indian National Sports Award recipients ===
Year	Recipient	Award	Gender	Ref(s)
2020	Yogesh Malviya	Dronacharya Award	Male	
2021	Himani Parab	Arjuna Award	Female	
2022	Sagar Kailas Ovhalkar	Arjuna Award	Male	

== See also ==
- Pole dancing
- Bo-taoshi
- Chinese pole
- Insuknawr
- Kalaripayattu
- Malla-yuddha
