= Asian Kho Kho Championship =

Official competition for senior national Kho Kho teams of Asia

- Current season, competition or edition: 2023 Asian Kho Kho Championship
- Sport: Kho Kho
- Founded: 1996(M); 2016 (W)
- First season: 1996 (M); 2016 (W)
- Administrator: Asian Kho Kho Federation
- Countries: AKKF Members
- Headquarters: New Delhi (India)
- Continent: AKKF (Asia)
- Most recent champions: India (4 title)(M); India (2 title) (W)
- Most titles: India (4 titles) (M); India (2 title) (W)
- Qualification: Kho Kho World Cup
- Level on pyramid: 1
- Tournament format: Round-robin and then knockout stage
- Website: Website

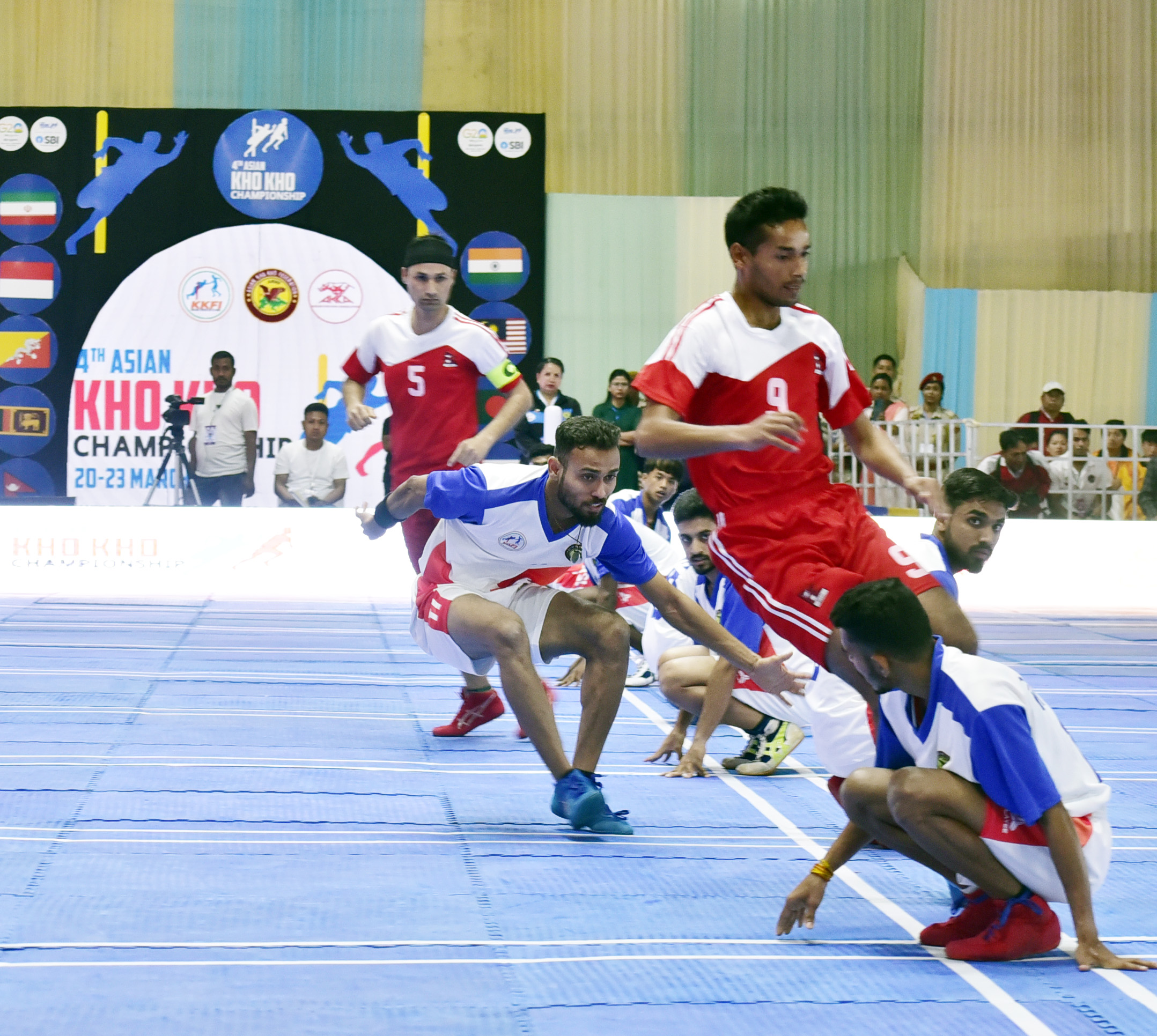
The India vs Iran match in the 2023 edition.

The Asian Kho Kho Championship is an international kho-kho tournament for Asian countries by Asian Kho Kho Federation (AKKFI). Four editions have been held so far: three in India, and one in Bangladesh.

== Asian Kho Kho Federation ==
Asian Kho Kho Federation
- Jurisdiction: Asia
- Membership: 12 members
- Abbreviation: AKKF
- Founded: 1987; 39 years ago
- Headquarters: New Delhi, India
- President: Rajeev Mehta
- Secretary: Rani Tiwari

== Results ==
The first edition of the tournament was held in Kolkata, India in 1996, and was contested by 5 teams. India defeated Bangladesh in the final.

The second edition was contested by 7 teams and took place in Dhaka, Bangladesh in 2000.

India won in both the men's and women's category in the 3rd edition in 2016, hosted in Indore, India.

The fourth edition was hosted in 2023 in Assam, India, and both the men's and women's categories were won by India. 10 countries participated, and it was hosted by the Kho Kho Federation of India.

== Men ==
- 1996 : 5 Teams: The participants are Bangladesh, Pakistan, SriLanks, Nepal and host India.
- 2000 : 6 or 7 Teams: India, Sri Lanka, Nepal, Thailand, Japan and host Bangladesh participated
- 2016 : 10 Teams
- 2023 : 10 Teams

Year	Host	Final			Third place match		
Year	Host	Champion	Points	Runner-up	Third place	Points	Fourth place
1996; Details	(India); Kolkata	India		Bangladesh			
2000; Details	(Bangladesh); Dhaka	India		Bangladesh			
2016; Details	(India); Indore	India	11 Points	Bangladesh	Nepal		Sri Lanka
2023; Details	(India); Assam	India	6 Points	Nepal	Bangladesh		Sri Lanka

== Women ==
- 2016 : 3 Teams
- 2023 : 8 Teams

Year	Host	Final			Third place match		
Year	Host	Winner	Score	Runner-up	3rd place	Score	4th place
2016	(India); Indore	India		Bangladesh	Nepal		None
2023	(India); Assam	India	33 Points	Nepal	Bangladesh		Sri Lanka

== See also ==
- Ultimate Kho Kho
