= Kho kho =

Traditional Indian tag game played in teams

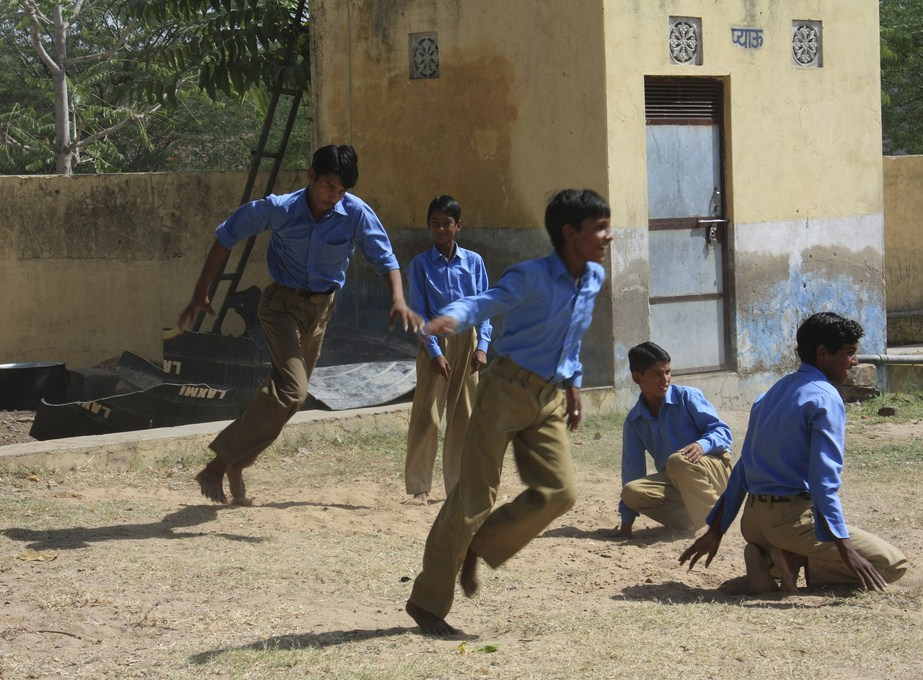
- A game of kho kho at a government school in India
- Highest governing body: International Kho Kho Federation
- Nicknames: Kho-kho; Chhoyan-chhuyin (Bengali)
- First played: India

Characteristics
- Contact: Permitted
- Team members: 15 players per side, 12 in the field in 4 batches and 3 extra
- Mixed-sex: No
- Equipment: None except the two poles on the court
- Glossary: Glossary of kho kho terms

Presence
- Country or region: Indian subcontinent
- Olympic: Demonstration sport: 1936
- World Championships: Kho Kho World Cup

Kho kho is a traditional Indian sport that dates to ancient India. It is one of the most popular traditional tag games in the Indian subcontinent after kabaddi. Kho kho is played on a rectangular court with a central lane connecting two poles at either end of the court. During the game, nine players from the chasing team (attacking team) are on the field, with eight of them sitting (crouched) in the central lane, while three runners from the defending team run around the court and try to avoid being touched or caught. Each sitting player on the chasing team faces the opposite half of the field.

In the game, one player from the chasing team (the "active chaser" or "attacker") may run around the court to tag (touch) members of the defending team. Each successful tag earns one point, and tagged defenders must leave the field. However, the active chaser is restricted from crossing the central lane to access the other half of the court and cannot change direction once they begin running toward either pole. These restrictions can be bypassed if the active chaser either switches roles with a sitting teammate — by touching them on the back while saying "Kho" — who is facing the other half of the court, or by running behind either pole to switch direction or halves. Each team alternates between scoring and defending, with two turns for each role. Each turn lasts nine minutes, and the team with the highest score at the end of the game wins.

The sport is widely played across South Asia, and also has a presence in other regions with a significant South Asian diaspora, such as South Africa and England. It is played most often by school children, and is also a competitive sport. The first franchise league for the sport, Ultimate Kho Kho, was unveiled in India in August 2022, and the inaugural World Cup was held in 2025.

== Etymology ==
The name comes from Marathi: खोखो (khō-khō), the word kho is an onomatopoeia of the sound invoked while playing the game.

== History ==
Kho kho has been played since at least the fourth century BC. Certain aspects of kho kho's gameplay may have been mentioned in the Mahabharata. In pre-modern times, it is believed that a version of kho kho known as Rathera was played on chariots (ratha meaning "chariot" in Sanskrit). The game was also known in ancient times as "Kho Dhwani Krida", translating as "a game where the sound 'kho' is made".

=== Modern era ===
The modern form of the game was standardised in 1914, with its rules and formalised structure being given by Pune's Deccan Gymkhana club. The first rule book of kho-kho was written by Bal Gangadhar Tilak. Kho-kho was demonstrated at the 1936 Berlin Olympics alongside other traditional Indian games.

It is now a medal sport in the South Asian Games, having first been played in the 2016 edition. The sport has also been spread overseas to the United Kingdom and South Africa by the South Asian diaspora. Within South Asia, it has been accepted into major sports events such as Khelo India and the National Games of India, with its growth supported by its simplicity and affordability. In the future, Indian officials have targeted adding kho kho to the Asian Games and 2036 Olympics. June 30 is celebrated annually as International Kho Kho Day.

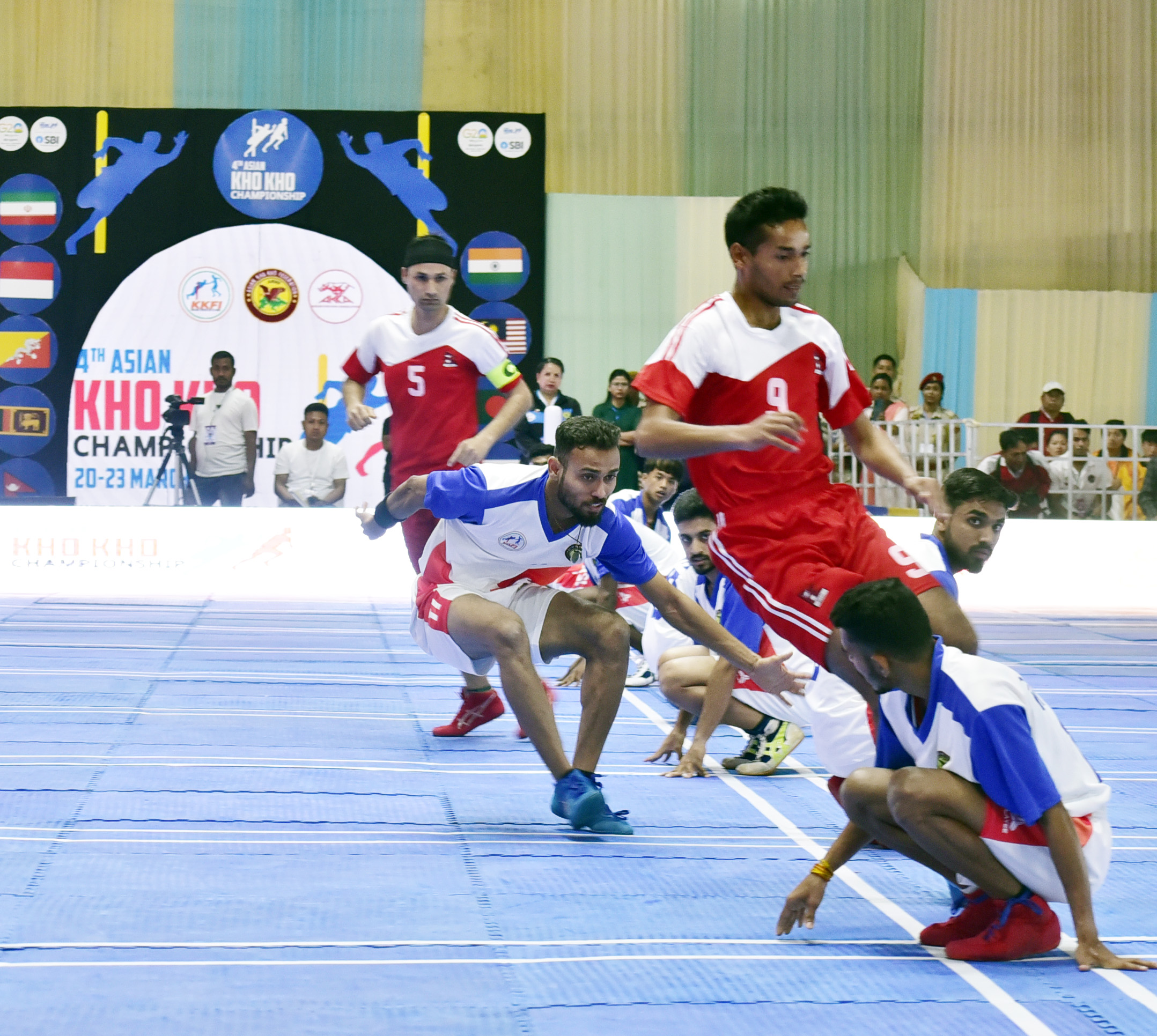
India vs Nepal at the 2023 Asian Kho Kho Championship

Kho kho's rules and appearance have changed over time; it was generally played on muddy surfaces in the past, but today is often professionally played on matted surfaces. This transition has altered the game, as more energy is required to run on a matted surface, with injuries also increasing to some extent. Various other aspects of the game, such as the poles and the dimensions of the playing field, were also added over time. In the early 21st century, a shortened format of the game was invented, aiming to increase spectator appeal. (Note: For example, standing up incorrectly no longer counts as a foul, so long as the player's hands and feet remain on the ground. The penalty for "early rising" and strict penalties associated with crossing the centre line and have also been removed.) In 2025, a kho kho ground was inaugurated in Australia with the innovative feature of removable poles, which allows other sports to take place on the field when desired.

Several major kho kho developments have taken place in India. In July 2022, the player draft for Ultimate Kho Kho was completed, which is a six-team franchise-based Indian kho kho tournament. Its inaugural season ran from August 14 to September 4, 2022. The Kho Kho Federation of India conducts the National Championships for men, women and juniors every year. India was also the host and winner of the inaugural 2025 Kho Kho World Cup.

== Rules ==
=== Field ===
The field is 27 by 16 metres (89 by 52 ft), with a distance of 24 metres (79 ft) between the two poles, and the central lane having a width of 30 centimetres (12 in). Each of the cross lanes (which pass through the sitting areas that the chasers sit in, and go from one side of the court to the other) has a width of 35 centimetres (14 in), with adjacent cross lanes 2.3 metres (7 ft 7 in) apart, and a separation of 2.55 metres (8 ft 4 in) between each pole and its adjacent cross lane. Each pole is 120 to 125 centimetres (47 to 49 in) high and 9 to 10 centimetres (3.5 to 3.9 in) in diameter. The poles are smooth and round, with no sharp edges. There are 1.5 m (4 ft 11 in)-long extensions of the court behind each of the poles known as "free zones", in which there are no restrictions on chasers' movements.

=== Gameplay ===
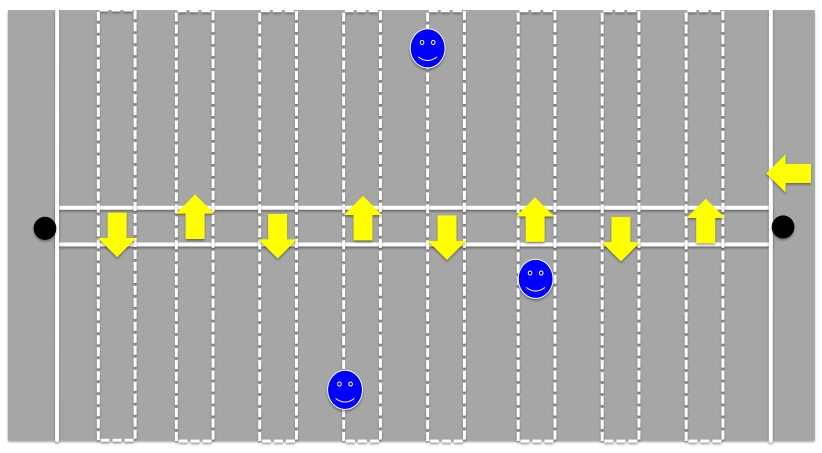
A depiction of the start of the game: the active chaser (far right arrow) stands next to the pole in the free zone, with the eight other chasers sitting in the central lane, and the three defenders (in blue) scattered throughout the field.

At the start of play, the active chaser starts off in one of the free zones, and can run into either half of the court to tag the three defenders. Once all three defenders have been tagged out or otherwise "dismissed", the next "batch" of three defenders comes onto the court.

The active chaser can switch roles with a sitting teammate by touching them on the back and shouting "kho"; this is known as the active chaser "giving a kho" to the sitting teammate. One kho must be given by the active chaser upon the dismissal of a batch before the chasing team can tag any players in the next batch. For the kho to be valid, it must be given before the active chaser has gone past the cross lane that the teammate is sitting within, with the sitting teammate not moving/rising before receiving the kho. Once a sitting chaser becomes active, they may only enter the half of the court which they were facing while they were sitting; additionally, once the newly active chaser steps to the left or right of the cross lane they were sitting in (or turns in such a way that their shoulders face towards either pole), they must continue in that direction until they have reached the free zone. Also, once the newly active chaser steps out of the central lane, they cannot step back into the central lane while tagging a defender.

Violating any of these rules results in a "foul", in which case the chasing team can no longer attempt to tag any defenders. In order to clear the foul, the active chaser must move in the opposite direction of the one they were running in (i.e. away from the defenders they were chasing) until they have either given a kho to a teammate, or reached the appropriate free zone.

The chasing team scores points each time a defender is ruled "out" (dismissed), which happens either when a chaser tags a defender without breaking any rules, when a defender steps out of the court (with no part of the body remaining grounded within), or when a defender is late to enter the court as part of a new batch after the dismissal of the previous batch.

In the case of a tie, some matches have a tiebreaker known as a "minimum chase", in which each team is allotted an additional turn to score. Each team's turn ends once they have scored one point, with the team that is faster at scoring a point during their minimum chase turn winning the match.

== International Kho Kho Federation ==
International Kho Kho Federation
- Jurisdiction: Worldwide
- Membership: 26 members
- Abbreviation: IKKF
- Founded: 2018; 8 years ago
- Headquarters: New Delhi, India
- President: Sudhanshu Mittal
- Secretary: Rohit Haldania

Official website
- www.khokho.net

The International Kho Kho Federation (IKKF) administers kho kho at the global level, and hosted the inaugural 2025 Kho Kho World Cup in collaboration with the Kho Kho Federation of India. The IKKF distinguishes between two main formats of kho kho: the standard "test format" and a seven-a-side "fast format", with the latter being used for the World Cup. It aims to expand the game to over 90 countries to meet the prerequisites for Olympic inclusion.

Participating Countries
| Country | Association | National Teams | IKKF affiliation |
Africa
| Ghana | Ghana Kho Kho Federation | M & W | |
| Kenya | Kenya Kho Kho Federation | M & W | |
| Mali | Federation Malienne De Kho Kho | M & W | |
| South Africa | Kho Kho Association of South Africa | M & W | |
| Uganda | Uganda Khokho Federation | M & W | |
| Tanzania | Tanzania Kho kho Federation | M & W | |
| Guinea Bissau | Guinea Bissau Kho kho Federation | M & W | |
| Tanzania | Tanzania Kho kho Federation | M & W | |
Americas
| Argentina | | M & W | |
| Brazil | Brazil Kho Kho Federation | M & W | |
| Bolivia | Bolivia Khokho Federation | M & W | |
| Canada | Kho Kho Canada | M & W | |
| Peru | Peruvian Kho kho Federation | M & W | |
| United States | USA Kho Kho Association | M & W | |
Asia
Asian Kho Kho Federation
| Bangladesh | Bangladesh Kho Kho Federation | M & W | |
| Bhutan | Bhutan Kho Kho Club | M & W | |
| Indonesia | Indonesia Kho Kho Federation | M & W | |
| India | Kho Kho Federation of India | M & W | |
| Iran | Kho Kho Association of Iran | M & W | |
| Malaysia | Kho Kho Association of Malaysia | M & W | |
| Nepal | Nepal Kho Kho Association | M & W | |
| Pakistan | Pakistan Kho Kho Federation | M & W | |
| South Korea | Korea Kho Kho Federation | M & W | |
| Sri Lanka | Sri Lanka Kho Kho Federation | M & W | |
| Philippines | Philippines Kho kho Federation | M & W | |
| Singapore | Singapore Khokho Federation | M & W | |
| Vietnam | Vietnam Khokho Federation | M & W | |
Europe
| England | Kho Kho Federation of England | M & W | |
| Germany | Kho Kho Federation of Germany | M & W | |
| Malta | Malta Khokho Federation | M & W | |
| Uganda | Uganda Khokho Federation | M & W | |
| Netherlands | Dutch Kho Kho Federation | M & W | |
| Poland | Kho Kho Poland | M & W | |
Oceania
| Australia | Kho Kho Australia | M & W | |
| New Zealand | Kho Kho Federation of New Zealand | M & W | |

Other international kho kho competitions, such as the Asian Kho Kho Championship, have been held with the collaboration of organisations such as the Kho Kho Federation of India and the Kho Kho Federation of England.

== Variations ==
=== Seven-a-side ===
UKK uses a modified set of rules referred to by the International Kho Kho Federation as the "fast format", as opposed to the standard "test format". The following modifications apply:

- Only 7 players from the attacking (chasing) team are on the field.
- The playing field is only 22 meters long and 16 meters wide. (Note: Certain other dimensions of the playing field are changed as well. For example, the boxes which the sitting chasers squat in have been turned into 40cm squares.)
- 2 points are scored per tag.
- A 30-second break is taken between the dismissal of one batch and the entry of the next batch. (Note: The attacking team can select any of its on-court players to be the active attacker at the start of the new batch. A kho does not need to be given by the attacker after the break.)
- If a batch of defenders can avoid being completely dismissed for at least 3 minutes (known as a "Dream Run"), they earn 1 point, and then an extra point for every 30 seconds survived afterwards.
- One attacking player (known as the wazir) may run in any direction when acting as the active attacker.
- The attacking team can take a powerplay in each of their attacking turns during which they have two wazirs. Each powerplay lasts until all 3 defenders of the current batch are out.
- Each team's turn to score/defend lasts 7 minutes, with the break time between turns also shortened.
- Tiebreaker (named "Minimum Chase"): Each team gets one additional turn to score (with the powerplay being active), and the team that scores its first point the fastest wins.

The game is split into two innings, each of which is split into two turns of seven minutes each. An interval of 3 minutes is taken after the end of the first inning, while a break of 2 minutes is taken after the end of the first and third turns respectively.

=== Unofficial variants ===
==== Shortest time wins ====
In one variation of kho kho, a team is no longer allowed to chase once it has tagged all the players on the other team. The team that tags all of its opponents in the shortest amount of time wins.

==== Circle kho-kho ====
In this variant, the field is modified so that it is simply a 5 m (16 ft) inner circle and a 7 m (23 ft) outer circle, with the outer circle acting as the boundary of the field. Instead of sitting, eight of the nine chasers stand in positions evenly spaced around the perimeter of the inner circle, with each alternate chaser facing into or away from the inner circle; when a chaser is given a kho, they can only run in the inside or outside of the inner circle depending on which way they were facing while inactive.

==== Standing kho-kho ====
This variant is played on a circular field, with an inner circle and outer boundary being demarcated. At the start of the game, two of the players are designated as the cat and the mouse respectively, with all other players becoming pitchers. The pitchers pair off and stand around the perimeter of the inner circle, with each pair holding each other by the elbow. The cat's goal is to tag the mouse; if the mouse links their elbow with one of the pitchers, then the pitcher who is not connected to the mouse disconnects from the pairing and swaps roles with the mouse. If the cat catches the mouse, then they swap roles.

In one variation of elbow tag, when a mouse links their elbow with one of the pitchers, the pitcher who disconnects from the pairing becomes a cat, and the previous cat becomes a mouse.

The same game is known as 'standing kho-kho' in South Asia, a variation of the Indian tag variant kho-kho. In the 'standing kho-kho' variant, players simply stand in front of or behind each other as opposed to hooking their elbows together.

==== Khokad ====
Each team has seven or more players, with all players from the defensive team standing in the central lane between the sitting chasers. The captain of the chasing team aims to tag the defenders, who are allowed to jump out of the central lane temporarily to avoid being tagged, without any help from a teammate. Once a defender is dismissed, the captain can, upon reaching one of the free zones, say "khok" along with the name of any of the sitting chasers, which results in that player becoming the active chaser. Once all defenders have been dismissed, the teams switch roles.

== Competitions ==
=== International competitions ===
Kho kho had been due to debut as a demonstration sport at the 2020 Asian Beach Games until that event was postponed due to the COVID-19 pandemic, and has previously been demonstrated at the 1982 Asian Games. Full integration with the Commonwealth Games is being aimed for by 2030.

==== Kho Kho World Cup ====
The Kho Kho World Cup is an international kho kho tournament. It is sanctioned by the International Kho Kho Federation.

The first Kho Kho World Cup took place in New Delhi, India from 13 to 19 January 2025. It witnessed the participation of 23 countries from six continents, featuring 20 men’s and 19 women’s teams. It was played under the seven-a-side fast format, which is used for Ultimate Kho Kho. India won both the men's and women's titles in the inaugural edition, staying unbeaten throughout the tournament.

=== Domestic competitions ===
==== Ultimate Kho Kho ====
Ultimate Kho Kho, abbreviated as UKK is an Indian franchise-based kho-kho league. Hosted by the Kho Kho Federation of India, it was founded in 2022. The first season had a viewership of 64 million, 41 million of which came from India, making UKK the third-most viewed non-cricket sports tournament in India after the Pro Kabaddi League and the Indian Super League.

== See also ==
- Atya Patya – Traditional Indian tag sport
- Langdi (sport) – Traditional Indian tag sport
- Duck, duck, goose (a related Western game)
