= 2023 Asian Kho Kho Championship =

- Location: Tamulpur, Assam, India

The 4th Asian Kho Kho Championship took place from 20 to 24 March 2023.

== Ranking ==
Thailand / Singapore WD

=== Results ===
- https://www.aninews.in/news/sports/others/4th-asian-kho-kho-championship-begins-in-assams-tamulpur-indian-men-women-teams-start-campaign-with-wins20230320235001/
- https://www.aninews.in/news/sports/others/4th-asian-kho-kho-championship-indian-men-women-in-semifinals20230323060118/
- https://web.archive.org/web/20250226122009/https://www.kgcas.com/latest-news/4th-asian-kho-kho-championship/
- https://web.archive.org/web/20250226122019/https://currentaffairs.adda247.com/indian-men-women-bag-4th-asian-kho-kho-titles/
- https://www.bodopedia.com/sports/winners-of-asian-kho-kho-championship-2023/
- https://www.bodopedia.com/sports/asian-kho-kho-championship/

=== Men (8 Team) ===
1. India
2. Nepal
3. Sri Lanka and Bangladesh

Other Teams: Iran/South Korea/Indonesia/Bhutan

Malaysia WD

A: India/Nepal/Iran/Bhutan

B: Bangladesh/Sri Lanka/South Korea/Indonesia

India vs Bhutan 47–34

Sri Lanka vs Indonesia 97–27

Bangladesh vs South Korea 43–13

Nepal vs Iran 64-8 or 74–8

India vs Iran +4

Bangladesh vs Indonesia +60

Sri Lanka vs South Korea +50

Nepal vs Bhutan +23

India vs Nepal +18

South Korea vs Indonesia +11

Bhutan vs Iran +5

Bangladesh vs Sri Lanka BAN win

India vs Sri Lanka

Bangladesh vs Nepal

🇮🇳India vs 🇳🇵Nepal

=== Women (8 Team) ===
1. India
2. Nepal
3. Sri Lanka and Bangladesh

Other Teams: South Korea/Indonesia/Bhutan/Malaysia

A: India/Sri Lanka/Bhutan/Malaysia

B: Bangladesh/Nepal/South Korea/Indonesia

India vs Sri Lanka 68–13

Bhutan vs Malaysia 49–13

Bangladesh vs Indonesia 46–19

Nepal vs South Korea 40–16

India vs Malaysia +64

Nepal vs Indonesia +58

Sri Lanka vs Bhutan +47

Bangladesh vs South Korea +63

India vs Bhutan +67

Sri Lanka vs Malaysia +34

Nepal vs Bangladesh +14

Indonesia vs South Korea INA Win

India vs Bangladesh

Nepal vs Sri Lanka

🇮🇳India vs 🇳🇵Nepal

== Men's edition ==
=== Playoffs ===
==== Semifinal 1 ====
India beat Sri Lanka by 45 points.

==== Semifinal 2 ====
Nepal beat Bangladesh by 12 points.

==== Final ====
India beat Nepal by 6 points and an innings.

== Women's edition ==
=== Playoffs ===
==== Semifinal 1 ====
India beat Bangladesh by 49 points and an innings.

==== Semifinal 2 ====
Nepal beat Sri Lanka by 59 points and an innings.

==== Final ====
India beat Nepal by 33 points and an innings.

== Links ==
- https://kkwc2025.com/gallery/4?title=4th%20Asian%20Kho%20Kho%20Championship,%202023
