= Nepal men's national kho kho team =

Nepali men's kho kho team

Nepal
- Association: Nepal Kho Kho Association
- Confederation: International Kho Kho Federation
- Head Coach: Bikki Raj Maharjan
- Captain: Hemraj Paneru

International record
- First international: v. India at Indira Gandhi Indoor Stadium, New Delhi (13 January 2025)
- Last international: v. India at Indira Gandhi Indoor Stadium, New Delhi (19 January 2025)

World Cup
- Appearances: 1 (first in 2025)
- Best result: (silver) 2nd (2025)

Asian Kho Kho Championship
- Appearances: 4 (first in 1996)
- Best result: (silver) 2nd (2023)
Medal record
Event	1st	2nd	3rd
Kho Kho World Cup	0	1	0
Asian Championship	0	1	1
Total	0	2	1
Kho Kho World Cup
Silver medal – second place	2025 New Delhi	
Asian Championship
Silver medal – second place	2023 Assam	
Bronze medal – third place	2016 Indore	

The Nepal men's national kho kho team represents Nepal in international men's Kho Kho competitions. It is governed by the Nepal Kho Kho Association and is a member of the International Kho Kho Federation (IKKF). Nepal finished runners-up at the 2025 Kho Kho World Cup in New Delhi, losing the final 54–36 to hosts India, and has also been runner-up (2023) and third (2016) at the Asian Kho Kho Championship.

== History ==
=== Asian Championship (1996–2023) ===
Nepal has taken part in each edition of the Asian Kho Kho Championship held to date, appearing in the five-team first edition in Kolkata in 1996 and in the 2000 tournament in Dhaka. At the 2016 edition in Indore Nepal finished third in the men's competition, and in the 2023 edition in Assam it finished as runner-up to India, with Bangladesh third.

=== 2025 Kho Kho World Cup ===
Nepal entered the inaugural Kho Kho World Cup, held at the Indira Gandhi Indoor Stadium in New Delhi from 13 to 19 January 2025, with a 15-man squad captained by Hemraj Paneru and the stated target of winning a medal.

Nepal's opening match, against hosts India on 13 January, was the first match in World Cup history; Nepal lost narrowly, 42–37. Placed in Group A, Nepal then beat Peru (80–34), Brazil (134–8) and Bhutan (98–8) to reach the knockouts. In the quarter-final Nepal beat Bangladesh 67–18, and in the semi-final it beat Iran 72–20. The final, on 19 January, was a rematch with India, who won 54–36. Nepal's women's team also lost their final to India, which was the first time a Nepali team had played in a World Cup final in any sport.

== Tournament history ==
=== Kho Kho World Cup ===
Kho Kho World Cup
Year	Host city	Position
2025	New Delhi, India	(silver) 2nd

Kho Kho World Cup record
Year	Result	Position	Pld	W	D*	L
(Nepal) 2025	Runner-up	2nd place, silver medalist(s)	7	5	0	2
Total	1/1	0 Titles	7	5	0	2

=== Asian Kho Kho Championship ===
Asian Kho Kho Championship
Year	Host	Position
1996	Kolkata, India	Participated
2000	Dhaka, Bangladesh	Participated
2016	Indore, India	3rd
2023	Assam, India	(silver) 2nd

== Recent results and fixtures ==
=== 2025 match results ===
Competition	Date	Round	Opponent	Score	Venue
World Cup	13 January 2025	Group A	India	37–42	Indira Gandhi Indoor Stadium, New Delhi
World Cup	14 January 2025	Group A	Peru	80–34	Indira Gandhi Indoor Stadium, New Delhi
World Cup	15 January 2025	Group A	Brazil	134–8	Indira Gandhi Indoor Stadium, New Delhi
World Cup	16 January 2025	Group A	Bhutan	98–8	Indira Gandhi Indoor Stadium, New Delhi
World Cup	17 January 2025	Quarter-final	Bangladesh	67–18	Indira Gandhi Indoor Stadium, New Delhi
World Cup	18 January 2025	Semi-final	Iran	72–20	Indira Gandhi Indoor Stadium, New Delhi
World Cup	19 January 2025	Final	India	36–54	Indira Gandhi Indoor Stadium, New Delhi

== 2025 World Cup squad ==
The following 15 players represented Nepal at the first Kho Kho World Cup in January 2025.

Name
Hemraj Paneru (c)
Janak Chand
Samir Chand
Bishwas Chaudhary
Suraj Pujara
Rohit Kumar Verma
Yaman Puri
Bed Bahadur Wali
Jhalak BK
Bikral Singh Ratgaiya
Bishal Tharu
Rajan Bal
Jogendra Rana
Bharat Saru
Ganesh Bishwakarma

== Coaching staff ==
Position	Name
Head coach	(Nepal) Bikki Raj Maharjan

== Honours ==
=== World ===
- Kho Kho World Cup:
  - Runners-up (1): 2025

=== Asia ===
- Asian Kho Kho Championship:
  - Runners-up (1): 2023
  - Third place (1): 2016

== Players ==
=== Captains ===
Hemraj Paneru captained Nepal at the 2025 World Cup.

== See also ==
- Nepal women's national kho kho team
- India men's national kho kho team
- Kho Kho World Cup
- Asian Kho Kho Championship
- Nepal Kho Kho Association
