= Kho Kho World Cup =

International Kho kho tournament

- Most recent season or competition: 2025 Kho Kho World Cup
- Sport: Kho kho
- Founded: 2025; 1 year ago
- Motto: The World Goes Kho
- No. of teams: M: 20; W: 19
- Region: International
- Venues: Indira Gandhi Arena, New Delhi, India
- Most recent champions: M: India (1st title); W: India (1st title)
- Most titles: M: India (1 title); W: India (1 title)
- Website: Website

The Kho Kho World Cup is an international kho kho tournament. It is sanctioned by the International Kho Kho Federation.

The first Kho Kho World Cup took place in New Delhi, India from 13 to 19 January 2025. It witnessed the participation of 23 countries from six continents, featuring 20 men’s and 19 women’s teams. It was played under the seven-a-side fast format, which is used for Ultimate Kho Kho. India won both the men's and women's titles in the inaugural edition, staying unbeaten throughout the tournament.

== History ==
The Kho Kho World Cup is the pinnacle of international competition for the sport of kho kho, governed by the International Kho Kho Federation to promote and globalize it.

The 2025 Kho Kho World Cup was hosted by India, the birthplace of kho kho. The event took place in 2025, from January 13 to 19, at the Indira Gandhi Arena, New Delhi. A total of 23 nations from six continents participated, featuring 20 men’s teams and 19 women’s teams. The Kho Kho Federation of India and the International Kho Kho Federation organized the event. The next World Cup will be in 2026-27 in Birmingham, England.

== Format ==
The matches adopt a fast-paced seven-a-side format, similar to the one used in Ultimate Kho Kho. There are two stages: the group stage, followed by the knockout stage.

=== Group Stage ===
In the group stage, teams are divided into four groups for the initial round-robin phase, each team competes against others in their group to determine standings.

=== Knockout Stage ===
In the knockout stage, the top two teams from each group advance to the knockout stage, including quarter-finals, semi-finals, and the final match.

== Results ==
=== Men ===
Year	Host	Winner	Score	Runner-up	Teams	Ref
2025	(India) Delhi	India	54–36; Result	Nepal	20	
2027	(England) Birmingham					

=== Women ===
Year	Host	Winner	Score	Runner-up	Teams	Ref
2025	(India) Delhi	India	78–40; Result	Nepal	19	
2027	(England) Birmingham					

== Performance record ==
Legend

C	Champions
RU	Runners-up
SF	Semi-finalist
QF	Quarter-finilist

GS	Group Stage
Q	Qualified
×	Did not qualify
	Hosts

=== Men's ===
Team	(India) 2025	2027	Appearances
Argentina	GS		1
Australia	GS		1
Bangladesh	QF		1
Bhutan	GS		1
Brazil	GS		1
England	QF		1
Germany	GS		1
Ghana	GS		1
India	C		1
Iran	SF		1
Kenya	QF		1
Malaysia	GS		1
Nepal	RU		1
Netherlands	GS		1
Peru	GS		1
Poland	GS		1
South Africa	SF		1
South Korea	GS		1
Sri Lanka	QF		1
United States	GS		1

=== Women's ===
Team	(India) 2025	2027	Appearances
Australia	GS		1
Bangladesh	QF		1
Bhutan	GS		1
England	GS		1
Germany	GS		1
India	C		1
Indonesia	GS		1
Iran	QF		1
Kenya	QF		1
Malaysia	GS		1
Nepal	RU		1
Netherlands	GS		1
New Zealand	QF		1
Peru	GS		1
Poland	GS		1
South Africa	SF		1
South Korea	GS		1
Sri Lanka	GS		1
Uganda	SF		1

== Statistics ==
=== Men's ===
Team	Appearances			Statistics					
Team	Total	First	Latest	Played	Won	Lost	Draw	NR	Win%
India	1	2025	2025	6	6	0	0	0	100 %
Nepal	1	2025	2025	7	5	2	0	0	71.42 %
Iran	1	2025	2025	6	5	1	0	0	83.33 %
South Africa	1	2025	2025	6	4	2	0	0	66.66 %
Bangladesh	1	2025	2025	5	4	1	0	0	80 %
England	1	2025	2025	5	4	1	0	0	80 %
Sri Lanka	1	2025	2025	5	3	2	0	0	60 %
Kenya	1	2025	2025	5	3	2	0	0	60 %
Australia	1	2025	2025	4	2	2	0	0	50 %
Bhutan	1	2025	2025	4	2	2	0	0	50 %
Ghana	1	2025	2025	4	2	2	0	0	50 %
South Korea	1	2025	2025	4	1	2	1	0	25 %
United States	1	2025	2025	4	1	2	1	0	25 %
Argentina	1	2025	2025	4	1	3	0	0	25 %
Malaysia	1	2025	2025	4	1	3	0	0	25 %
Peru	1	2025	2025	4	1	3	0	0	25 %
Brazil	1	2025	2025	4	0	4	0	0	0 %
Germany	1	2025	2025	4	0	4	0	0	0 %
Netherlands	1	2025	2025	4	0	4	0	0	0 %
Poland	1	2025	2025	4	0	4	0	0	0 %

=== Women's ===
Team	Appearances			Statistics					
Team	Total	First	Latest	Played	Won	Lost	Draw	NR	Win%
India	1	2025	2025	6	6	0	0	0	100 %
Nepal	1	2025	2025	7	6	1	0	0	85.71 %
South Africa	1	2025	2025	6	5	1	0	0	83.33 %
Uganda	1	2025	2025	6	4	2	0	0	66.66 %
Bangladesh	1	2025	2025	5	3	2	0	0	60 %
Kenya	1	2025	2025	5	3	2	0	0	60 %
New Zealand	1	2025	2025	5	3	2	0	0	60 %
Iran	1	2025	2025	4	2	2	0	0	50 %
England	1	2025	2025	4	3	1	0	0	75 %
Peru	1	2025	2025	4	2	2	0	0	50 %
Sri Lanka	1	2025	2025	4	2	2	0	0	50 %
South Korea	1	2025	2025	3	1	2	0	0	33.33 %
Australia	1	2025	2025	4	1	3	0	0	25 %
Bhutan	1	2025	2025	4	1	3	0	0	25 %
Poland	1	2025	2025	4	1	3	0	0	25 %
Malaysia	1	2025	2025	3	0	3	0	0	0 %
Germany	1	2025	2025	4	0	4	0	0	0 %
Indonesia	1	2025	2025	4	0	4	0	0	0 %
Netherlands	1	2025	2025	4	0	4	0	0	0 %

== Team debuts ==
=== Men's ===
Year	Teams	Number	Total	Ref
2025	Argentina; Australia; Bangladesh; Bhutan; Brazil; England; Germany; Ghana; India; Iran; Kenya; Malaysia; Nepal; Netherlands; Peru; Poland; South Africa; South Korea; Sri Lanka; United States	20	20	

=== Women's ===
Year	Teams	Number	Total	Ref
2025	Australia; Bangladesh; Bhutan; England; Germany; India; Indonesia; Iran; Kenya; Malaysia; Nepal; Netherlands; New Zealand; Peru; Poland; South Africa; South Korea; Sri Lanka; Uganda	19	19	
