= Kilambi Ramanujachari =

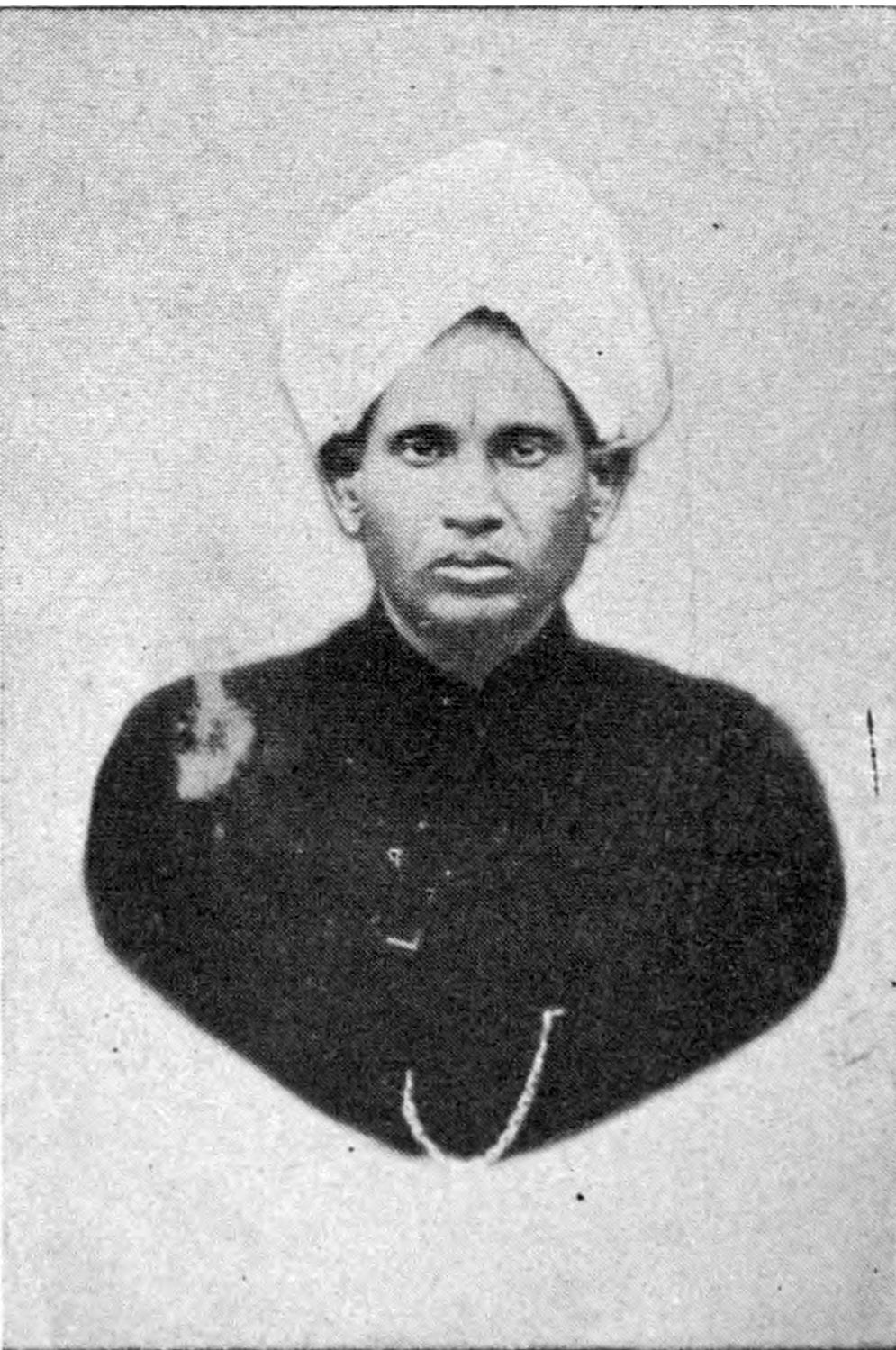
Rao Bahadur Kilambi Ramanuja Chariyar at the Indian Biographic Dictionary.

Kilambi Ramanujachari (1852–1928), shortly K. Ramanujachari, was an Indian lawyer and administrator.

He impressed the Rajah immensely by performing Avadhanam (he was declared an Ashtavadhani and subsequently a Shatavadhani). The Rajah sponsored his further studies in Presidency College, Madras.

He was awarded the title of "Rao Bahadur" by the British Government in 1912. Andhra University awarded Honorary Doctorate (D.Litt.) to him in 1927.
