= Asavadi Prakasarao =

Indian poet (1944–2022)

Asavadi Prakasa Rao
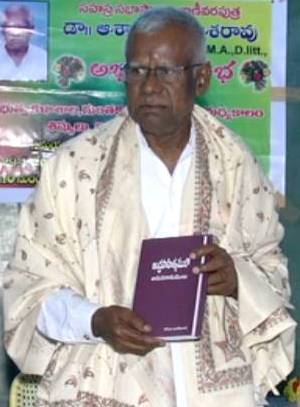
- Prakasa Rao releasing a book in 2017
- Born: Aasadi Prakasam; 2 August 1944; Korivipalli, British Raj
- Died: 17 February 2022 (aged 77); Penukonda, Andhra Pradesh, India
- Occupation: Telugu lecturer
- Known for: Writer, poet, critic, scholar and speaker
- Spouse: Vaduguru Lakshmi Devi
- Parents: Teacher Pakkiirappa (father); Kullaayamma (mother)
- Awards: Padma Shri (2021); Kala Ratna

Asavadi Prakasa Rao (2 August 1944 – 17 February 2022) was an Indian poet, critic, translator and scholar, who is known for his poetry and prose works. He is noted for his significant contribution to Telugu and Sanskrit literature. In January 2021, he was awarded India's fourth-highest civilian award the Padma Shri in the Arts and Literature category. As Ashtavadhani, he performed 171 avadhanams and wrote around 50 books across various genres. His most notable literary contribution is his performance of Avadhanam – a literary performance. He received an honorary D Litt from Potti Sreeramulu Telugu University and a Distinguished Teacher award from the Department of Higher Education, Government of Andhra Pradesh.

== Early life ==
Asavadi Prakasarao was born to Kulayamma and Fakeerappa on 2 August 1944 in Korivipalli. His teacher Nanduri Ramakrishnamacharya changed his name to the optimist Prakash Rao. Born into a Dalit family, he spent his childhood in the villages of Beluguppa and Sirpi. He did his primary education in the social welfare schools in those villages. He was educated at Potti Sriramulu Municipal Boys' School and Rajendra Municipal High School in Anantapuram between 1953 and 1959. He completed PUC at Government Arts College, Anantapur, between 1960 and 1961. He also completed his B.A. at Government Arts College, Anantapur.

== Career ==
Prakasarao was accepted as a teacher in Avadhanam education. He made his first Avadhanam in 1963 at the age of 19. According to the writer U. Atreya Sarma, he was the only avadhani from a Scheduled Caste community in India. He performed 171 ashtavadhanams (avadhanams with eight questioners) in the Telugu-speaking regions as well as in Tamil Nadu, Karnataka, Delhi and other places. His avadhanams were also broadcast on All India Radio (Akashvani).

== Social work ==
A library was established by him at his residence in Penukonda. This library operates 24/7 and membership is free; in addition to which, it provides accommodation and food free of cost. In 2009, his family began an endowment fund, through which awards were conferred upon poets, women writers, and spiritual leaders irrespective of caste or religion.

== Death ==
Prakasarao died from cardiac arrest at his home in Penukonda, on 17 February 2022, at the age of 77.

== Literary works ==
Asavadi's Parvatishatakamu (Sri Parvati Satakam), a devotional satakam of 108 verses addressed to Parvati, was first published in 2003 and issued again in 2005 and 2008. It is composed in the tetagiti metre, and every verse closes with the refrain "Parvatimata! Ashrita Parijata!". The opening five verses embed the bija syllables Om, Shrim, Hrim, Klim and Saum.

Two of his works were done for the Tirumala Tirupati Devasthanams (TTD). In 1986, TTD published his prose version of the third canto of Potana's Bhagavatamu, and it has been reprinted several times. He also edited the palm-leaf manuscript Chellappillaraya Charitramu, written by Tallapaka Annaya, a grandson of Annamacharya; it tells of the marriage of Balaji to Bibi Nanchari, and TTD published it in 1982 and reprinted it in 2009. His Bhartrihari Vairagya Sati (2014) is a commentary on the Sanskrit verses of Bhartrihari, with the Telugu verse translation done by Chepyala Ramakrishna Rao, and in 2016 he wrote Mala Dasari, with a commentary, for TTD's Brahmam-Okkate series; it is the story of a devotee of Vishnu. His Telugu Padya Kavita Prasthanam, on the craft of poetry, was published by Telugu Akademi in 2012 for the 4th World Telugu Conference, and his free verse collection Antaranga Tarangalu has been translated into English and Hindi.

== Awards and honours ==
- Kala Ratna Award from Government of Andhra Pradesh
- Jashuva Padya Kavita Puraskaram from Telugu Academy
- Padma Shri from Government of India

== See also ==
- List of Padma Shri award recipients (2020–2029)
