= Cultural history of India =

Indian culture, often labelled as a combination of several cultures, has been influenced by a history that is several millennia old, beginning with the Indus Valley Civilisation and other early cultural areas. Influences from the Muslim world and the West, primarily the United Kingdom, significantly affected the culture during the second millennium.

== Ancient era ==
The culture of the Indo-Aryans became the main culture of ancient India; however, a variety of indigenous groups were also present which interacted with the Indo-Aryans. The geography of the Indian subcontinent shaped the region's interactions with the world, as the northern mountain ranges restricted contact with the rest of Asia, and the Indian Ocean to the south enabled Indian sailors to trade and export their culture and religion. It has often been argued that the bounteousness of the natural environment in the subcontinent, coupled with the inevitability of the vicious impact of certain natural cycles such as the monsoon, made Indians more attracted towards comforts while becoming more accepting of a challenging fate.

== Indo-Muslim era ==
Indo-Persian culture refers to a cultural synthesis present on the Indian subcontinent. It is characterised by the absorption or integration of Persian aspects into the various cultures of modern-day republics of Bangladesh, India, and Pakistan. The earliest introduction of Persian influence and culture to the subcontinent was by various Muslim Turko-Persian rulers, such as the 11th-century Sultan Mahmud Ghaznavi, rapidly pushed for the heavy Persianization of conquered territories in northwestern Indian subcontinent, where Islamic influence was also firmly established. This socio-cultural synthesis arose steadily through the Delhi Sultanate from the 13th to 16th centuries, and the Mughal Empire from then onwards until the 19th century. Various dynasties of Turkic, Iranian and local Indian origin patronized the Persian language and contributed to the development of a Persian culture in India. The Delhi Sultanate developed their own cultural and political identity which built upon Persian and Indic languages, literature and arts, which formed the basis of an Indo-Muslim civilization.

Persian was the official language of most Muslim dynasties in the Indian subcontinent, such as the Delhi Sultanate, the Kashmir Sultanate, the Bengal Sultanate, the Mughal Empire and their successor states, and the Sikh Empire. It was also the dominant cultured language of poetry and literature. Many of the Sultans and nobility in the Sultanate period were Persianised Turks from Central Asia who spoke Turkic languages as their mother tongues. The Mughals were also culturally Persianised Central Asians (of Turko-Mongol origin on their paternal side), but spoke Chagatai Turkic as their first language at the beginning, before eventually adopting Persian. Persian became the preferred language of the Muslim elite of northern India. Muzaffar Alam, a noted scholar of Mughal and Indo-Persian history, suggests that Persian became the official lingua franca of the Mughal Empire under Akbar for various political and social factors due to its non-sectarian and fluid nature. The influence of these languages led to a vernacular called Hindustani that is the direct ancestor language of today's Hindi–Urdu varieties.

The Persianisation of the Indian subcontinent resulted in its incorporation into the cosmopolitan Persianate world of Ajam, known today academically as Greater Iran, which historically gave many inhabitants a secular, Persian identity.

== Colonial era ==
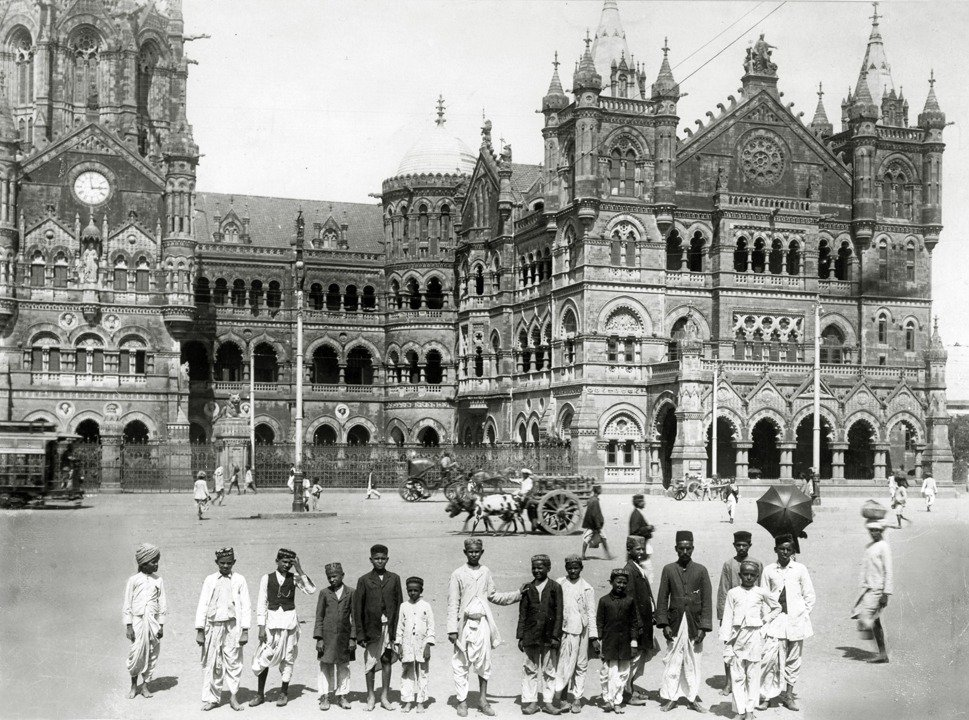
The Victoria Terminus in 1910

Western culture was introduced into India through a variety of means, as British colonialism and Christian missionaries sought to reshape local culture. The struggle for cultural and political supremacy played out in a variety of ways, such as in sports, which was later picturised in the 2001 film Lagaan. The most noticeable legacy of this period is the English language which emerged as the administrative and lingua franca of India and Pakistan (and which also greatly influenced the native languages) followed by the blend of native and gothic/sarcenic architecture. The modern Indian city came into shape, as seen in the history of modernisation and community synthesis in Bombay (Mumbai).

British archaeologists and cultural enthusiasts played a significant role during the colonial era in rediscovering and publicising some of India's pre-Islamic heritage, which had begun to disappear during the Indo-Muslim period, as well as preserving some of the Mughal monuments.

By the late colonial era, the nationalist movement had begun to chalk out a path forward for India. Under Mahatma Gandhi's leadership, the movement reached a greater level of creativity in drawing upon foreign and precolonial heritage. Jawaharlal Nehru, who went on to become India's first Prime Minister, likened India's culture to an "ancient palimpsest on which layer upon layer of thought and reverie had been inscribed, and yet no succeeding layer had completely hidden or erased what had been written previously" in his book The Discovery of India.

== Contemporary era ==
Early postcolonial Indian culture was based around the struggle of having to build a new nation, which was shaped by the 1947 experience of decolonisation from British rule and the partition. Nirad C. Chaudhuri argued in 1954 that the Westernisation of India had actually peaked after India's independence, brought on by a Westernised ruling class and inducing deeper changes in the way of life of Indians than were perceived by most observers.

In the 21st century, competing forms of nationalism, be they civic, religious (see Hindutva), ethnocultural or otherwise, have increasingly shaped cultural debates in India and its neighbours.

== See also ==
- History of the British Raj
- Asian relations with Northeast India
