= Medasani Mohan =

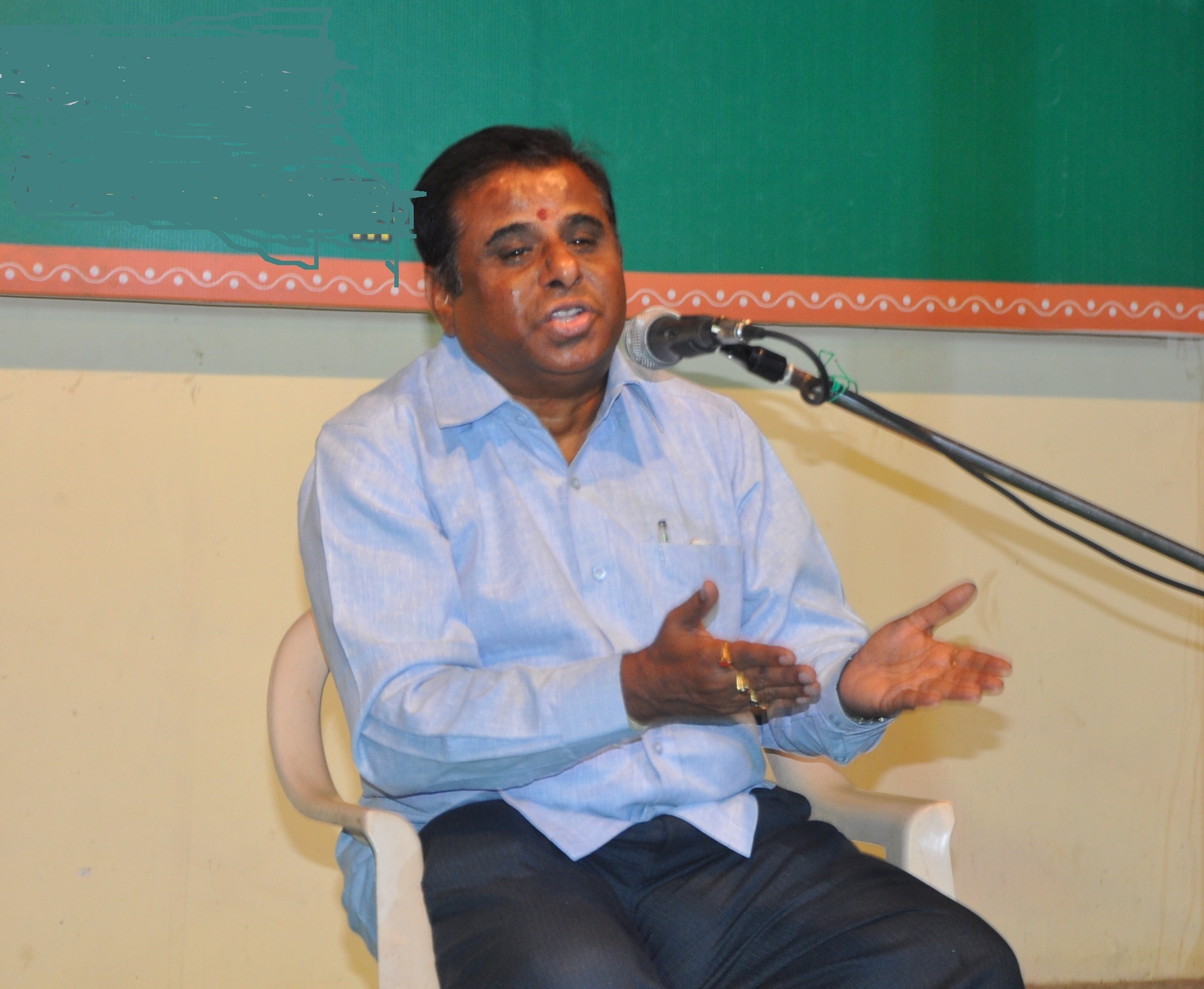
Dr.Medasani Mohan

Dr Medasani Mohan (born 19 April 1955) is a famous Avadhani. he was the director of Annamacharya Project initiated by the Tirumala Tirupati Devasthanam. He belongs to Nadimpalli village of Andhra Pradesh in India. . He participated in International Internet Avadhanam (IIA). He holds the record of answering 5,000 scholars at a time.

== Early life ==
He was born on April 19, 1955, in a village called Nadimpalli, which belongs to Chandragiri Mandal, Chittoor District of Andhra Pradesh in India. His parents are Ayyanna Naidu and Lakshmamma. From his 8th standard he evinced his interest in Telugu and Sanskrit literature. At the age 15, he performed his first Ashtavadhanam and got appreciation from the Pundits. As a student he practiced Yoga and improved his power of retention. He also took spiritual initiation from an Avadhuta called Sivananda Mouni. In 1978 he completed his M.A. in Telugu literature from Sri Venkateswara University, Tirupati. Later he completed his Ph.D. from Madras University on Annamacharya Keerthanas.
