= Sport in British India =

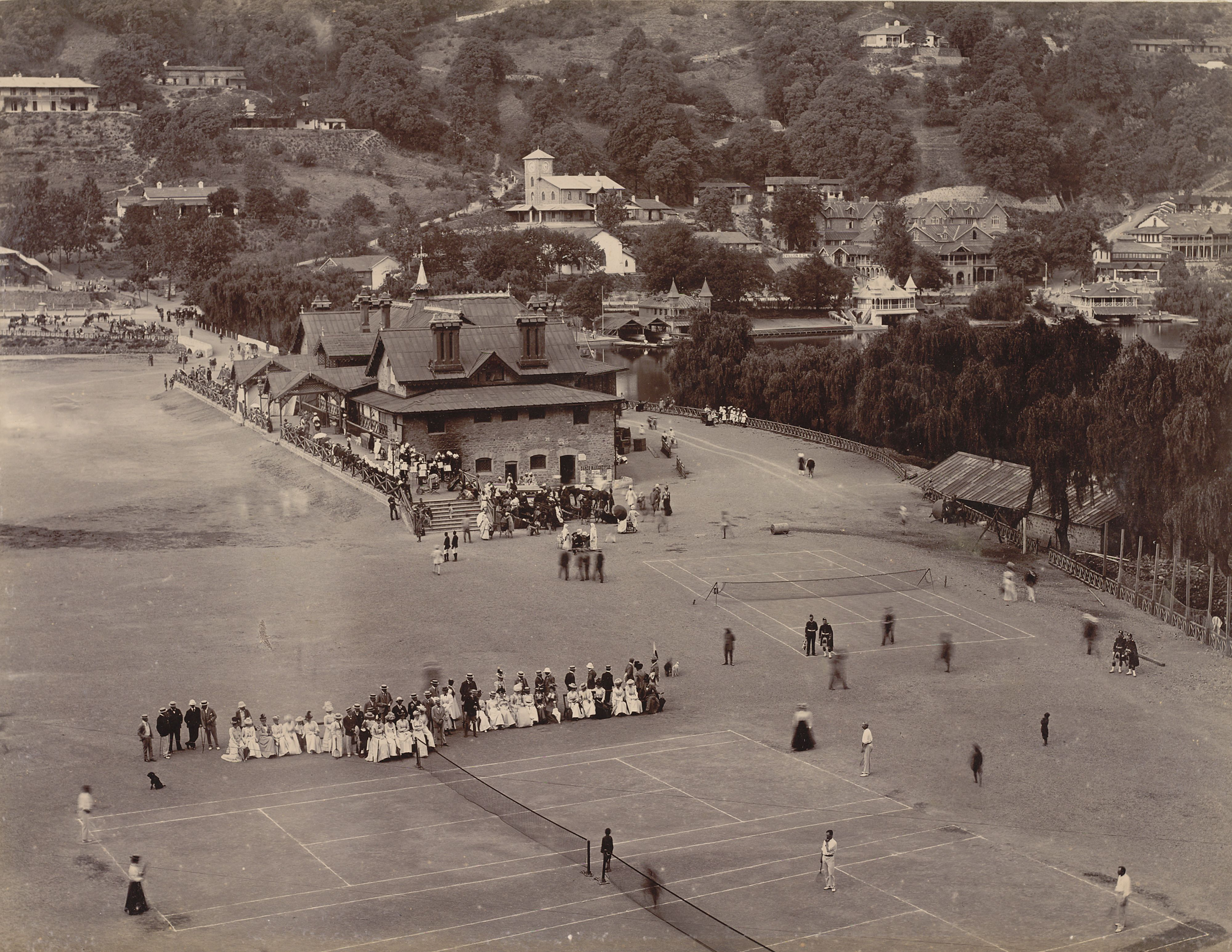
1899 tennis tournament in Nainital, a town established by the British in the earlier part of the century

During the British rule of India, (Note: British India included present-day India, Pakistan and Bangladesh.) sport played a significant role in shaping interactions between the rulers and the native population. British influence saw the native sports, such as kabaddi and kho-kho, decline in popularity but become more standardised, as seen in their demonstration at the 1936 Summer Olympics. British sports were also imported with the aim of spreading British values; this effort intensified after the Rebellion of 1857, and was often executed indirectly through the rulers of the princely states. Some Indians participated in these sports to rise up the social hierarchy by imitating their colonisers, while others aimed to achieve victory against the British as a form of anti-colonial resistance.

The economic struggles prevailing at the time limited people's overall ability to participate in sport.

== British involvement ==
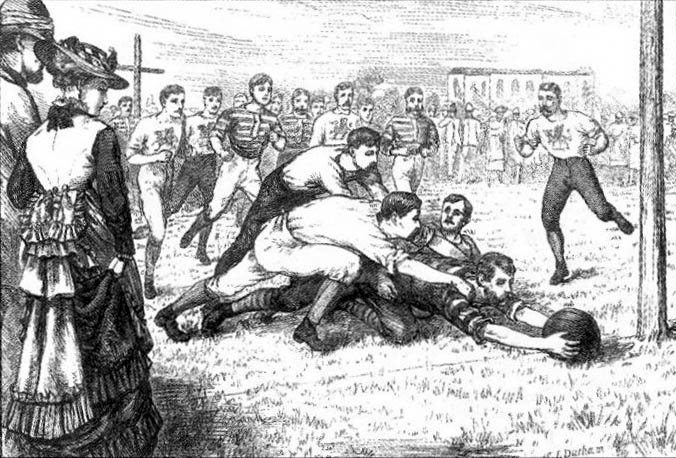
An 1875 painting of rugby being played by Europeans in Calcutta (now Kolkata).

=== Early history ===
In 1721, prior to the British East India Company's rise, its mariners played cricket at Khambhat (then Cambay) in western India, the earliest known reference to cricket in the Indian subcontinent.

During the colonial era, soldiers would play British sports as a way of maintaining fitness, since the mortality rate for foreigners in India was high at the time, as well as to maintain a sense of Britishness; in the words of an anonymous writer, playing English sports was a way to "defend themselves from the magic of the land". In the early days, the British began clubs, which only whites could join. These clubs were a place where men could gather together to drink, socialize, and play sports. The games played in the clubs included cricket, badminton, rugby, golf, and rowing.

A popular horseback activity was pig-sticking.

=== Influence on India ===
The interaction between local beliefs and Western sporting practices sometimes manifested itself in anti-sport ways; for example, the initial introduction of football at one Srinagar school, designed to produce physical fitness among the children, had to take place by force because the schoolboys saw contact with the leather ball as defiling them, and similar sentiments of avoiding defilement led to Brahmins preferring cricket because it didn't involve physical contact with lower castes. An American observer later commented that the British physical education regime also appeared to be meant to produce a "race of subservient people" through its emphasis on elements such as military drills.

One of the world's earliest football clubs, the Mohun Bagan was established in 1889. The club was formed when The Football Association of England began making standard rules for football before FIFA, the international governing body of football was founded.

== Inventions ==
=== British-practiced sports ===
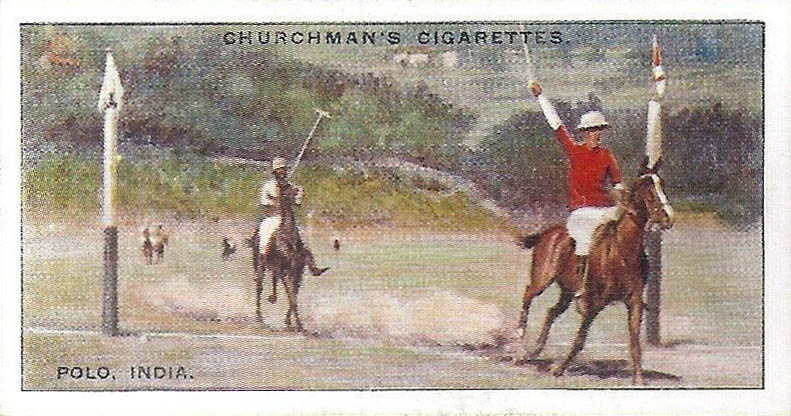
Polo involving a British officer

Modern polo originated in British India in the 19th century (Note: Although polo had been played since the medieval period, the modern version was conceptualized in British India.) in Manipur, as a standardisation of a game known locally as Sagol Kangjei, Kanjai-bazee, or Pulu. The name polo is the anglicized version of the lattermost term. The first polo club was established in Silchar, Assam, in 1833. The oldest polo club still in existence is the Calcutta Polo Club, which was established in 1862.

Snooker originated in the late 19th century among British Army officers stationed in India. In the mid-19th century, badminton also grew among officers stationed in Poona (now Pune). Some British board games, such as Snakes and Ladders and Ludo, were inspired by Indian board games.

== Native sports ==
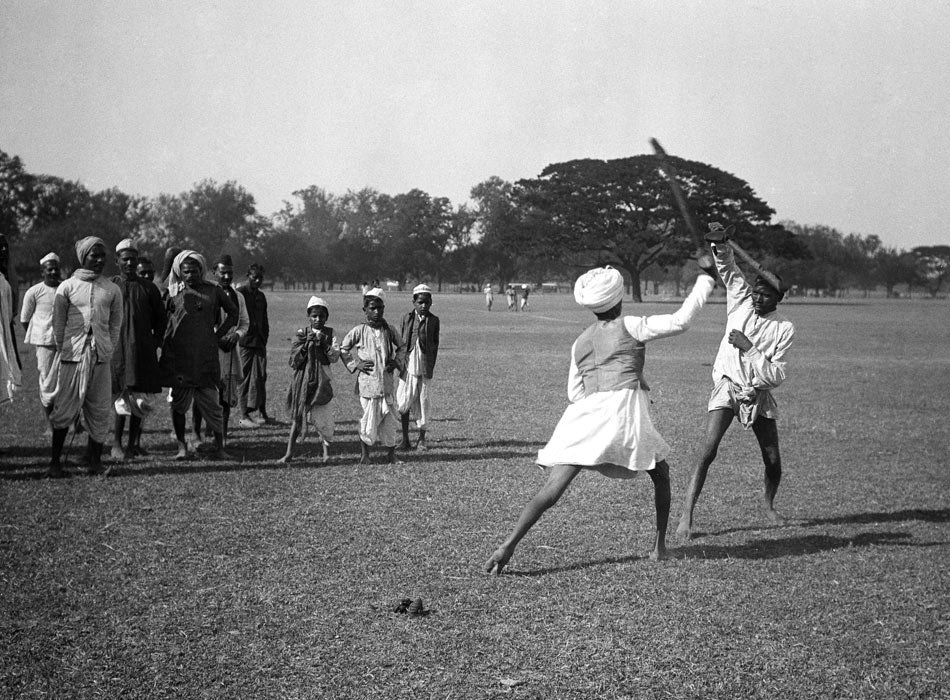
Rural contest in the 1900s

The British sought to impose their standards of physical discipline onto Indians, while discouraging traditional Indian games and negatively depicting Indian physiques. They disarmed and demilitarized Indian society throughout the 19th century.

Some self-funded sports clubs, such as the akharas, vyayamshalas, and kreeda mandals promoted and organized competitions at various levels for traditional games during this time. Traditional games and practices which were considered to embody masculine values, such as kabaddi and kushti, were promoted as a way to resist British accusations of effeminacy; Sikhs for example used their martial history as a way to distinguish themselves.

Some traditional games, such as kho-kho, were also exported to places like the Caribbean, Africa, and other parts of Asia where indentured Indian servants had been taken by the British.

=== Standardisation ===
At the same time that imported sports were being developed by the British, indigenous sports continued to change and develop. However, after Indian Civil Service officer Walter Charles Rand was assassinated in 1897 by the Chapekar brothers who ran a wrestling venue in Pune, British colonial authorities viewed these indigenous sports venues with suspicion. A committee was established in 1914 in order to set rules for kho-kho. The formalization of Indian sports continued in the region, and the Deccan Gymkhana sports club was instrumental in organizing the first Indian delegation to an Olympic games, which participated in the 1920 Summer Olympics. Other clubs, such as the Maharashtra Mandal club, which formed in the early 20th century, promoted physical culture and education by hosting both indigenous and Western sports.

Other indigenous sports and exercises developed as well, especially yoga. In the 1920s, Bhawanrao Shriniwasrao Pant Pratinidhi, the ruler of Aundh State, helped popularize the series of yoga positions called Surya Namaskar, a flowing sequence of salutations to the sun. This series contained popular asanas (positions) such as upward and downward dog and Uttanasana which helped to popularize yoga as exercise.

Beginning in the 1910s, local Indian organizations were established in order to propagate and develop Indian physical culture. One such organization, initially called Hanuman Akhara, was formed in 1922 by the Vaidya brothers in Amravati and eventually became the Hanuman Vyayam Prasarak Mandal (HVPM). A satellite organization of the HVPM helped to revise the rules for kabaddi in the 1930s after the Indian YMCA had first formulated the rules in earlier years.

== Politics ==
India was under direct British colonial rule from 1858 to 1947, and showed constant political, social, and cultural resistance throughout history. Though the British Raj had attained direct control over the subcontinent, there was a perspective that the Native Indians were able to cultivate their own form of national empowerment and a sense of implicit sovereignty through means of sport.

=== British aims ===
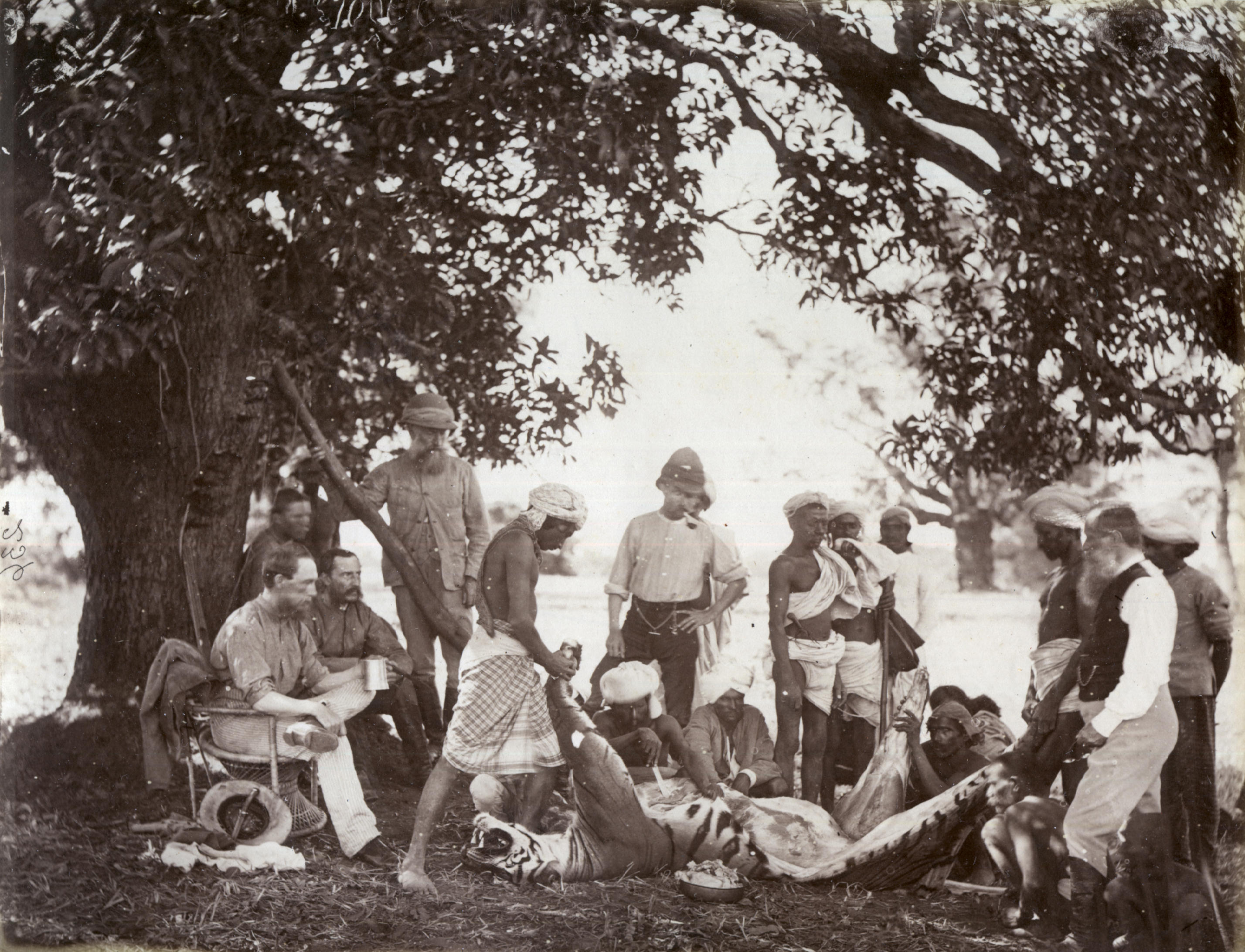
The aftermath of a successful tiger hunt. The British used animal hunting as a way to emphasise their imperial superiority

The British used sport as another conduit of transferring British socio-political ideas, culture, and beliefs into the fabric of India's system. As Australian author Brian Stoddart writes in his article on British sports and cultural imperialism, “Colonial governors were especially important in emphasizing cricket as a ritual demonstration of British behavior, standards, and moral codes in both public and private.” Despite many Indians being a part of white-dominated sports teams, there was an inevitably constant re-emphasis of the superior and inferior race ideology within the teams. During this era, there was a prevailing mindset amongst the British colonizers, being the fact that they viewed the Indians through a lens of superiority, which was reflected through socio-political events, specifically through sports. The British believed that the Indians were the inferior and effeminate race, taking the opportunity of sport as a mission to mold, reshape and therefore improve the Native race into a stronger, more physically capable race.

=== Indian nationalism ===
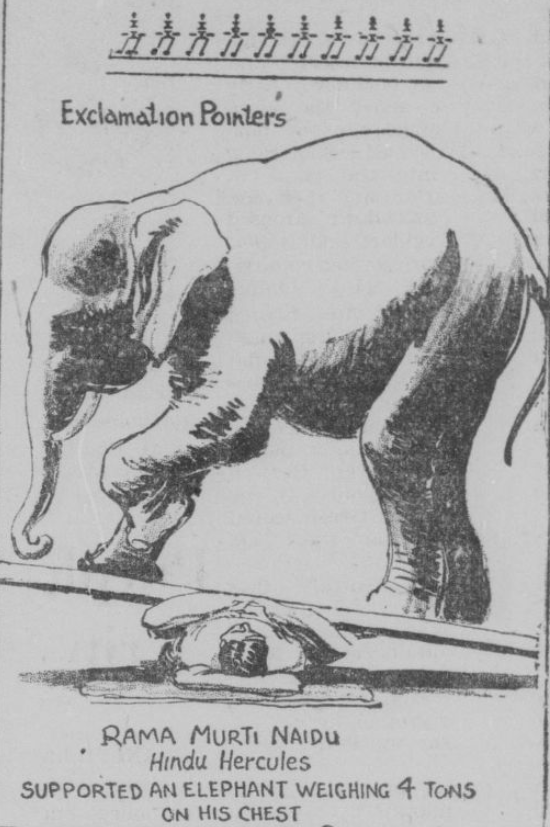
Kodi Rammurthy Naidu lifting an elephant; his strongman efforts were meant to counter British accusations of Indian effeteness

Unsurprisingly, the native Indians were not keen on giving up their traditions to follow their colonizers, as author Subhadipa Dutta emphasizes through the quote of “the colonized were not always fascinated to ‘mimic’ the manly gestures and leisure pursuits of their white masters.” To illustrate this, in his book, Ramachandra Guha has delved deep into the political aspect of religion, race and caste within sports teams, especially cricket. Guha successfully highlights the significance of the socio-cultural factors that are entwined in cricket, and how it encouraged the indigenization of the sport. Cricket came to be seen as a unifying way to demonstrate resistance and success against the colonisers and helped in reducing various forms of societal discrimination, with tours to the United Kingdom starting in 1911 displaying aspects of Indian progress and international diplomacy. The Indian Social Reformer argued in 1906, after an Indian victory over a European side in the Bombay Presidency powered by chamar (low-caste) cricketers, who earlier had not been allowed to even dine with their teammates, that the occasion was "a landmark in the nation’s emancipation from the old disuniting and denationalizing customs."

Meanwhile, football came to be seen as an equalising game that cut across class lines and united the global anti-imperialist struggle in left-wing regions such as Kerala and West Bengal. British accusations of Indian effeminacy, which enabled them to demonstrate superiority and powered their programs to reshape local practices, were resisted in a variety of ways, with success against British teams seen as contributing to national revival.

Consequently, a strong desire stemming from frustration arose from the Indians; a desire to essentially reclaim their country that has been controlled by Europeans. The theory that Indians resisted British colonialism through sports to regain power over their country has been evident in various scholarly articles, books, and monographs. Specifically, in the 1963 memoir Beyond a Boundary, Trinidadian Marxist intellectual C. L. R. James compares Indians on the field to Greek drama plays: “selected individuals played representative roles which were charged with social significance.” The author explains that there is irony between the English origins of the sport and the means of which Indians use it as a way to express their national identity – an identity which they feel was stolen from them as a result of the British Raj rule. This is further evident through the quote “... Social and political passions denied normal outlets, expressed themselves so fiercely in cricket precisely because they were games.”

Furthermore, emphasizing and delving deep into its meanings, the memoir offers crucial points regarding the concept of native Indians expressing sovereignty within the games that they play. The memoir leads the reader to speculate beyond the meaning of cricket being a game for pleasure to view Englishness as an inherent and leading force within the actual sport. Through the lens of James’ memoir, the sport evolves into a nuance where Englishness intersects with West Indian identity formation, both in and beyond the field. Indians used sports as a gateway or an opportunity to regain national pride and identity, ultimately fighting against the British narrative. The colonized therefore developed their own physical strength and power while confronting and rejecting the components of imperial ideology. They developed proud self-image throughout time as a significant step for achieving freedom and establishing popular sovereignty, which underscores the revolutionary power of resistance amongst Indians against their British colonizers through harvesting strength and national self-determination and identity.

=== Communities ===
Sport sometimes factored into the promotion of communal violence, as was the case with football clubs in Calcutta.

== Events ==
=== International events ===
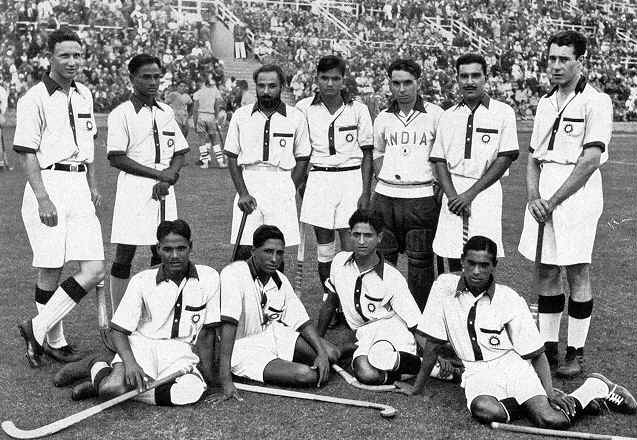
The Indian Hockey team at the 1936 Berlin Olympics, later going on to defeat Germany 8–1 in the final

Dorabji Tata, with the support of Dr. A.G. Noehren, the then-director of YMCA, established the Indian Olympic Association in 1927.

British India competed at six Olympic Games, winning medals in field hockey. (Note: Due to misinformation many believes that hockey is national sport/game of India, but it is wrong. There is no national sport/game of India. Sports ministry of India told in an answer to RTI question in 2020, that there is no official national game of India.)

== Non-British foreign influences ==
=== North America ===
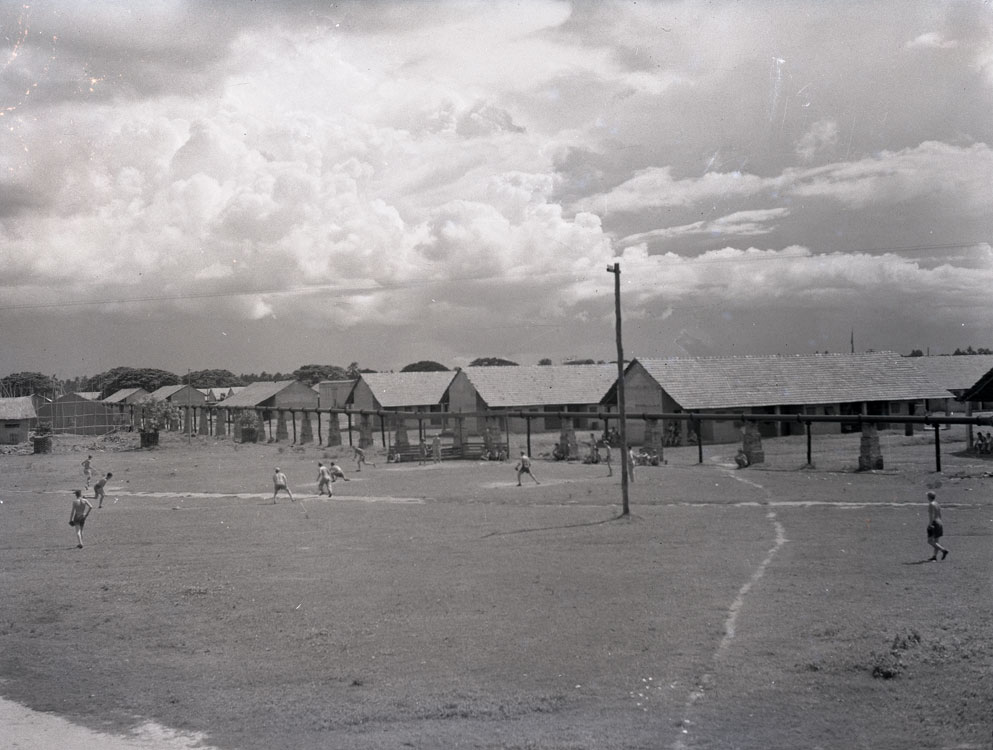
American troops playing baseball in Calcutta barracks during World War II

The YMCA played a role in bringing Western physical culture and ideas around Muscular Christianity, while also shaping the development of modern yoga. Harry Crowe Buck was one of the major proponents at the time.

== See also ==
- Culture of British India
- History of sport in Myanmar
