= Avadhanam =

Indian literary performance genre

Avadhānaṃ (literally meaning "concentration") is a genre of performance in India, where a performer (called the avadhāni) answers challenging questions from several questioners in parallel. The most popular variety, called sāhitya (literary) avadhānam involves the performer composing poetry, thereby entertaining the audience and demonstrating the poetic skills of the performer. The art form was developed particularly by Telugu poets in medieval times. It involves the partial improvisation of poems using specific themes, metres, forms, or words. There is a tradition of mentoring in Avadhanam. The best avadhanis have contributed to the oeuvres of Telugu and Kannada poetry.

== Method ==
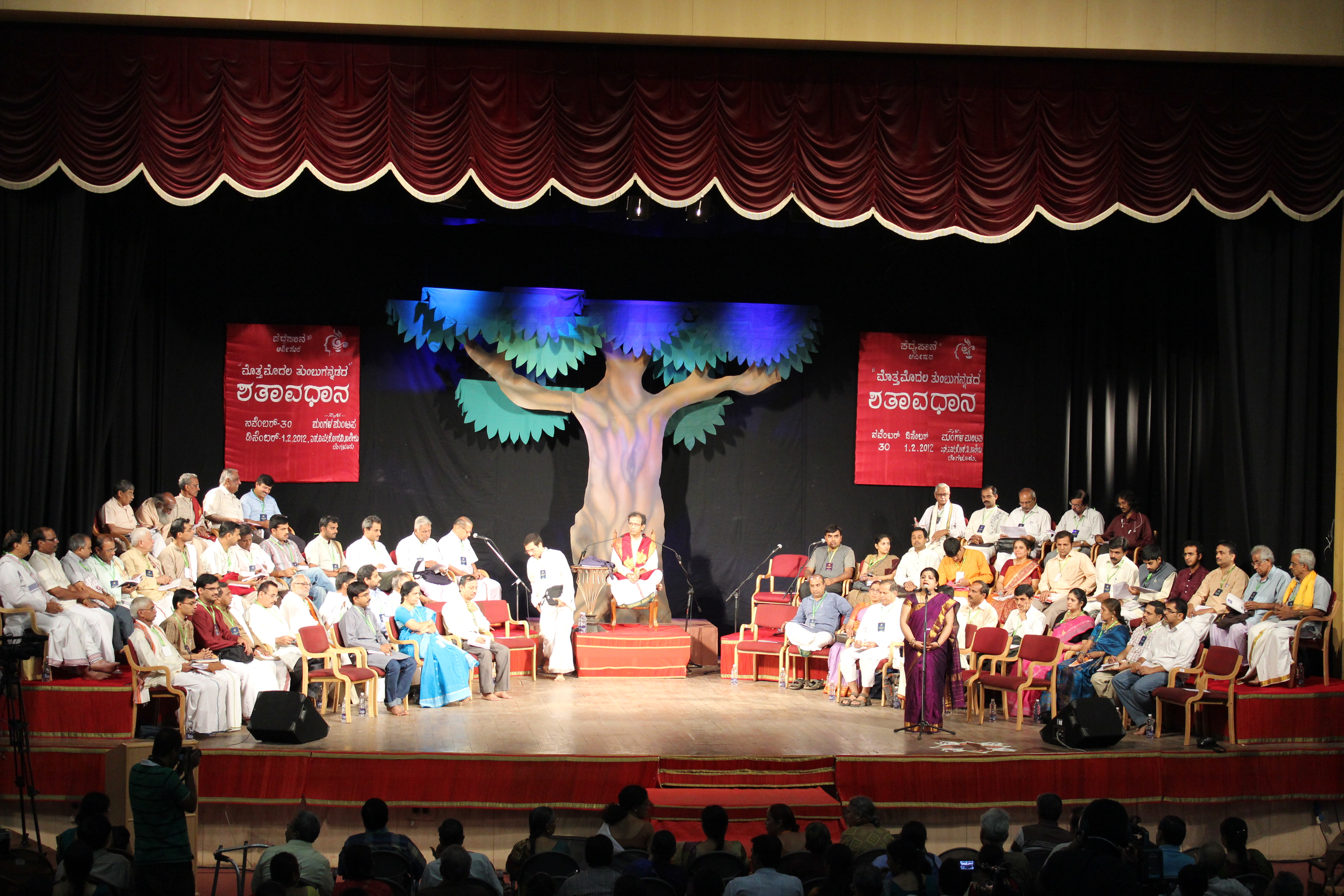
Performance of an avadhanam in Kannada with 100 questioners, with the avadhani on a raised podium and questioners on either side

Avadhānaṃ requires a talent for memorisation, intellect, an extensive knowledge of Indian poetry, prosody and performance skills.

The avadhāni (performer) demonstrates his skill by completing tasks concurrently. These tasks are set by the pṛcchaka (questioner). The leading questioner is called the pradhāna pṛcchaka.

Several of the tasks require creating a four line poem that conforms to chandas or metre, the basic rhythm of verse. Generally, the questioner will give the performer a description of the subject in prose. The performer will then give their reply in the form of a poem. The questioner may increase the difficulty by imposing restrictions, for example, requesting a particular form of poem or the inclusion of particular elements in the poem.

The performer's first reply is not an entire poem. Rather, the poem is created one line at a time. The first questioner speaks and the performer replies with one line. The second questioner then speaks and the performer replies with the previous first line and then a new line. The third questioner then speaks and performer gives his previous first and second lines and a new line and so on. That is, each questioner demands a new task or restriction, the previous tasks, the previous lines of the poem, and a new line.

This process continues, sometimes over several days until the performer makes a mistake and is disqualified or is able to recite his entire poem of four lines. This final success is the dharana.

Furthermore, one of the questioners may be made responsible for setting tasks for aprastuta-prasangam or "extraneous speech-making" (in essence, "gift of the gab"). This questioner is appreciated for his own wit and the ingeniousness of his silly questions.

The greater the number of questioners, the more difficult the performance. There might be 8 (aṣtāvadhānaṃ), 100 (śatāvadhānaṃ) or 1000 (sahasrāvadhānaṃ). A person who has successfully performed opposite 8 questioners is called an aṣtāvadhāni, opposite 100 is a satāvadhāni and opposite 1000 is a sahasrāvadhāni.

Other less commonly performed avadhana include chitravadhanam (painting), nrutyāvadhānaṃ (dancing), gaṇitāvadhānaṃ (mathematics) and netrāvadhānaṃ (dexterity of eye movements).

== History ==
=== Medieval India ===
Medieval India refers to the era between the fall of the Gupta Empire in the mid-6th century CE to the rise of the Mughal Empire in the early 16th century CE. Avadhanam is noted at the time of the Muslim conquests in the Indian subcontinent in the courts of the Turks.

Jain poets performed Avadhanam for Mughal emperors and their subahdars (provincial governors). Those who performed at the court of Akbar (Mughal emperor 1556–1605 CE) included Nandivijay (mentored by monk, Vijayasen Suri) who performed the Ashtavadhana form and Siddichandra (mentored by monk, Hiravijaya Suri) who performed the Shatavadhana form, completing 108 simultaneous tasks. Both were well received. Siddhichandra was a guest of the Mughal court until late in the time of Jahangir (Mughal emperor 1605–1627 CE).

Yashovijay Suri, the author of the work Jain Tarka Bhasha, performed several avadhanams at Ahmedabad in the 17th century, including 18 performances before Mohabat Khan, the Subahdar of Gujarat under Aurangzeb (Mughal emperor 1658–1707 CE).

=== 19th and 20th centuries ===
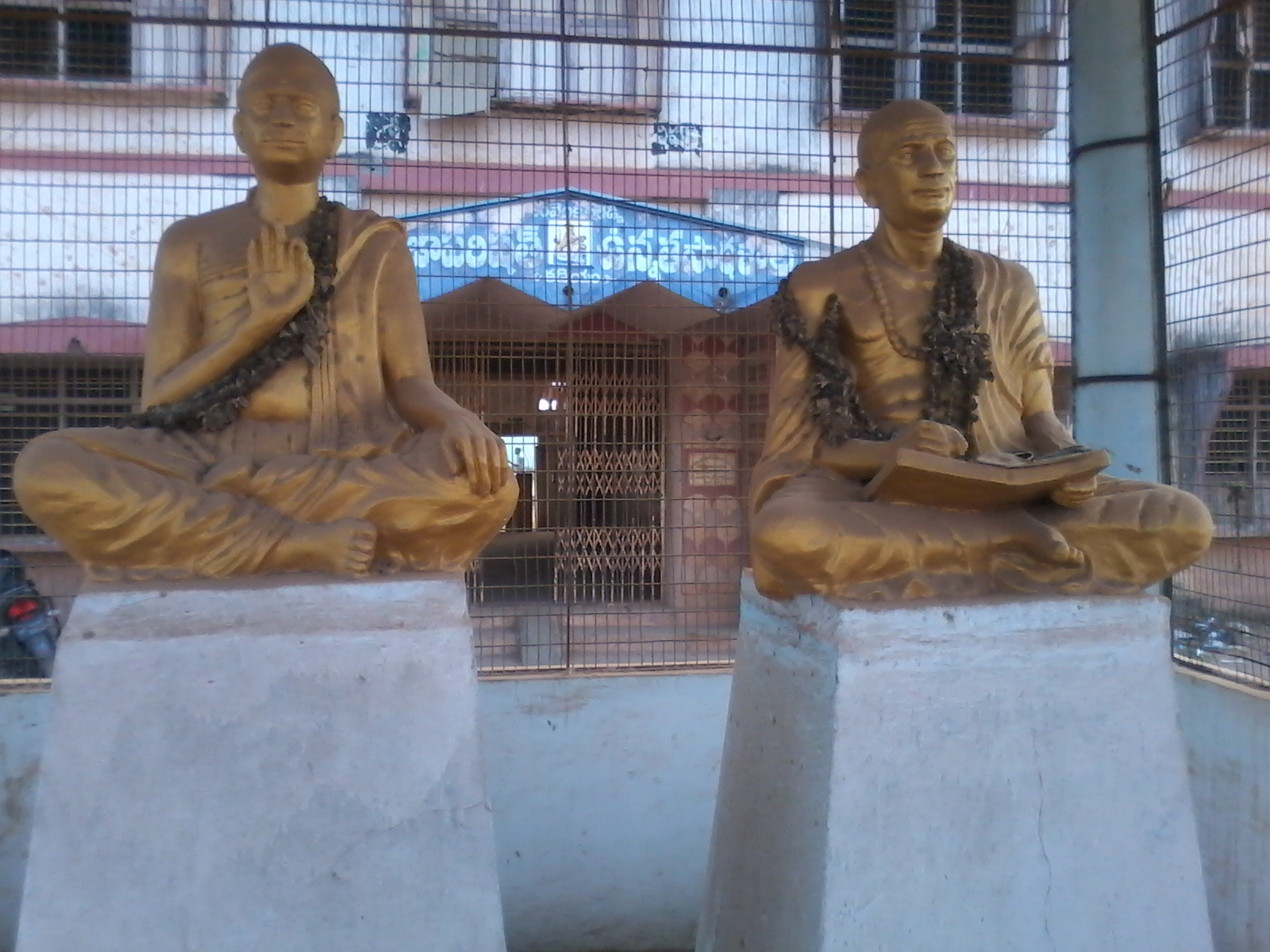
Tirupati Venkata Kavulu statues at a high school

In the late 19th century, Telugu avadhana was popularized by Tirupati Venkata Kavulu, the cousin duo Divakarla Tirupati Sastry (1871–1919) and Chellapilla Venkata Sastry (1870–1950). Their contemporaries include Kopparapu Sodara Kavulu, who was known for the rapidity of his compositions, and Venkata Raamakrishna Kavulu. Tirupati Venkata Kavulu mentored Viswanatha Satyanarayana (1895–1976), a Jnanpith Award winner (for contribution to literature), Subbanna Satavadhani and Paada Subrahmany Sastry.

Sathavathani Sheikh Thambi Pavalar (1874–1950) was a Tamil poet. On 10 March 1907, he performed sathavadhanam at Victoria Public Hall in Chennai (formerly Madras). On 31 December 2008, Pavalar was honoured with the release of a commemorative postage stamp.

Shrimad Rajchandra (1867–1901), also known as Param Krupalu Dev, was a Gujarati Jain poet and shatavadhani whose skills impressed Mahatma Gandhi.

Vidwan Ambati Subbaraya Chetty (1906–1973) was an ashtavsdhani was an historian, poet, and independence advocate. Under British rule, in Andhra Pradesh, he became the first district magistrate of Indian heritage in Andhra Pradesh under British rule.

Pandit Veni Madhav Shukla was a scholar and shatavadhani from Jaunpur. He was a relative of the Indian Hindu religious leader Rambhadracharya.

From 18 February 2007 to 20 March 2007, Medasani Mohan (born 1955) performed an avadhanam called Apoorva Pancha Sahasra Avadhanam. It is seen as record breaking and an exemplar of several forms of poetry such as seesa padya, champakamala, sardulam, mattebhavikriditha, and thetageetha. The questioners included at least 1000 poets and 4000 scholars. The subjects of poetry included untouchability, AIDs, women's power, the internet, computers, students and so on.

Gadiyaram Ramakrishna Sarma (1919–2006) was a poet, social reformer and independence advocate from Alampur, Andhra Pradesh performed avadhaanam. He is known for his efforts to revive the temples of Alampur.

Perala Bharata Sarma was a late 20th century academic in the field of Sanskrit literature who performed ashtavadhanams.

=== 21st century ===
==== Telugu avadhanis ====
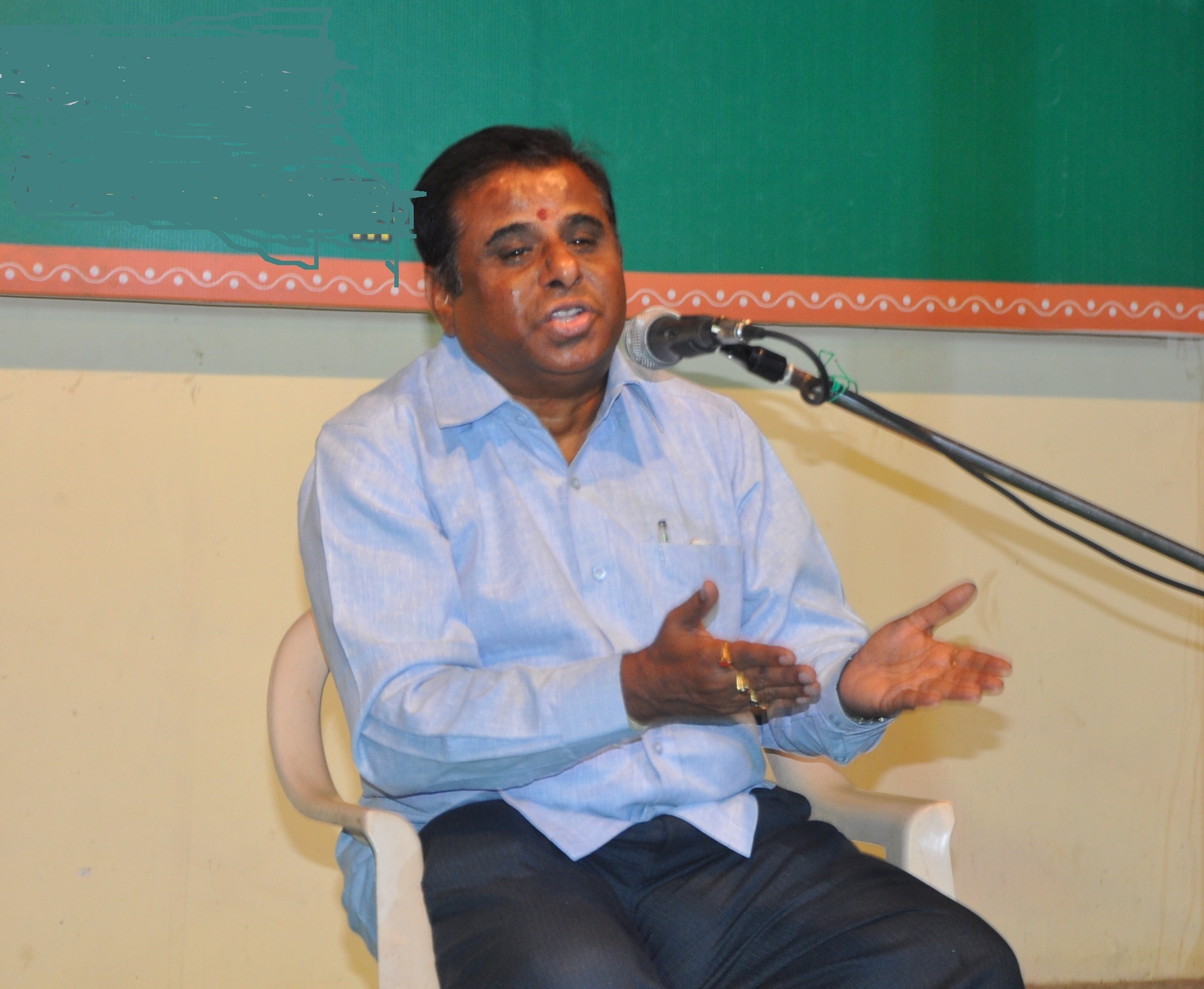
Medasani Mohan

Medasani Mohan (b. 1955) is referred to as Apoorva Pancha Sahasravadhana Sarvabhouma for being the first to perform a pancha sahasra avadhanam (an avadhanam with 5000 questioners). He has performed a very large number of a variety of avadhanam.

Garikapati Narasimha Rao (b. 1958) is referred to as Maha Sahasraavadhani and Dhaarana Brahma Raakshasa for his achievements. He is the author of Saagara Ghosha.

Rallabandi Kavitha Prasad (1961–2015) was a director of the department of culture in Andhra Pradesh performed many avadhanams of various types and developed the vidya form. Osmania University in University awarded him a doctoral degree for his thesis on avadhanam vidya. Prasad wrote an anthology of modern poetry titled ontari poola butta and books including Kadambini.

Akella Bala Bhanu is a Sanskrit lecturer at Aditya Junior College in Amalapuram. She performed an ashtaavadhanam in Kovvur, Andhra Pradesh at 18 years of age. Bhanu is the first and only female Shathhavadhani. She is related to Bharatam Srimannayarana Garu and Yeluripati Anantaramayya Garu.

Asavadi Prakasarao (1944–2022) was mentored by CV Subbanna. Prakasarao, a member of the marginalised Dalit caste performed his first avadhanam at 19 years of age.

Madakasira Krishna Prabhavathi is a Telugu author who was a principal at the Government Railway Junior College in Guntakal.

Other contemporary Telugu adhavanis include, Madugula Nagaphani Sarma, Amudala Murali, Vaddiparti Padmakar (a tribhasha sahasravadhani who is multilingual), Kadimella Vara Prasad, Gannavaram Lalit Aditya (a Vasma Foundation Yuvasiromani Award winner from the United States), Bulusu Aparna (a Sanskrit Teacher in Tirumala), and Dorbhala Prabhakara Sarma.

==== Sanskrit and Kannada avadhanis ====
Shatavadhani Ganesh (R. Ganesh) (b. 1962) is a prolific and multilingual avadhani. He introduced chitra-kavya to the art of avadhanam.

Pandit Sudhakar Kallurkar, an avadhani from the Uttarhadi Hindu monastery performed for Satyatma Tirtha (b. 1973).

Vid. Gundibailu Subrahmanya Bhat from Udupi, is a scholar of the vedanta philosophy and has achieved a vidwath certification in Hindu classical voice. He performs in Sanskrit and Kannada.

Vid. Ramnath Acharya from Udupi is a scholar of Dvaita Vedantha philosophy and is also a Shatavadhani. He perforrms in Sanskrit and Kannada.

==== Tamil avadhanis ====
Rama. Kanaga Subburathinam performs sodasa avadhani (one with sixteen skills).

==== Jain avadhanis ====
Muni Manak Maharaj is a multilingual avadhani from Sujangarh who was mentored by Acharya Tulsi. He has knowledge of astrology, palmistry and numerology.

Muni Rajkaran (b. Rajasthan 1927) was a widely travelled monk mentored by Acharya Tulsi. With knowledge of Jain Agamas, Sanskrit and Prakrit he performed 500 or more avadhanams on one day.

Muni Mahendra Kumar (b. 1937) became a monk in 1957, a contemporary of Acharya Tulsi and Acharya Mahaprajna. He on the faculty of the Jain Vishva Bharati Institute, Ladnu. He instructs in Jain (Preksha) meditation. Kumar is the author of the cosmology texts including The Enigma of the Universe and Vishva Prahelika in Hindi. He has performed shatavadhana at universities and international conferences.

Muni Ajitchandra Sagar (b. 1988) is mentored by Acharya Shree Naychandrasagarji Mharaj. He performs samyukta avadhanas, mahashatavadhana, netravadhana (use of the eyes) and ganitavadhana (mathematics). in 2009, he demonstrated the shatavadhana at a Jain Doctors' Federation conference in Ahmedabad. In 2012, in Mumbai, Sagar demonstrated the dvishatavadhana, hearing 200 questions including puzzles, names of objects, places and persons, Sanskrit shlokas, factual and philosophical questions, foreign language words and complex mathematical problems with closed eyes. Sagar holds the Guinness world record for being the world's second-fastest speaker.
