= Korivipalli =

- Village
- Interactive map of Korivipalli
- Location in Andhra Pradesh, India Korivipalli (India)
- Coordinates: 14.86541°N 77.79050°E
- Country: India
- State: Andhra Pradesh
- District: Anantapur
- Talukas: Singanamala
- Elevation: 287 m (942 ft)

Population (census 2011)
  - Total: 932

Languages
  - Official: Telugu
- Time zone: UTC+5:30 (IST)
- Postal code: 515435

Korivipalli is a medium size village located in Singanamala mandal of Anantapur district in the state of Andhra Pradesh in India with total 217 families residing. The Korivipalli village has population of 932 of which are males while 478 are females as per Population Census 2011.

== Demographics ==
In Korivipalli village population of children with age 0-6 is 80 which makes up 8.58% of total population of village. Average Sex Ratio of Korivipalli village is 1053 which is higher than Andhra Pradesh state average of 993. Child Sex Ratio for the Korivipalli as per census is 1424, higher than Andhra Pradesh average of 939.

Korivipalli village has lower literacy rate compared to Andhra Pradesh. In 2011, literacy rate of Korivipalli village was 60.56% compared to 67.02% of Andhra Pradesh. In Korivipalli Male literacy stands at 70.78% while female literacy rate was 50.58%.

== Geography ==
Korivipalli is located at 14.865500°N 77.790553°E.
