= History of the British Raj =

History of the British direct rule on the Indian subcontinent

After the Indian Rebellion of 1857, the British Government took over the administration from Company rule in India to establish the British Raj there. The British Raj was the period of Crown rule in India between 1858 and 1947, for around 200 years of British occupation. The system of governance was instituted in 1858 when the rule of the East India Company was transferred to the Crown in the person of Queen Victoria.

The British Raj in the Indian subcontinent lasted until 1947, when the British provinces of India were eventually partitioned into two sovereign dominion states (thus, undermining the idea of Dominion, as the original pre war British Dominions were not sovereign): the Dominion of India and the Dominion of Pakistan, leaving the princely states to choose between them. Most of the princely states decided to join either the Dominion of India or the Dominion of Pakistan, except the state of Jammu and Kashmir. It was only at the last moment that Jammu and Kashmir agreed to sign the "Instrument of Accession" with India. The two new dominions later became the Republic of India and the Islamic Republic of Pakistan (the eastern half of which became the People's Republic of Bangladesh in 1972). The province of Burma in the eastern region of the British Indian Empire had been made a separate colony in 1937 and became independent in 1948.

The East India Company was an English and later British joint-stock company. It was formed to trade in the Indian Ocean region, initially with Mughal India and the East Indies, and later with Qing China. The company ended up seizing control of large parts of the Indian subcontinent, colonised parts of Southeast Asia, and colonised Hong Kong after a war with Qing China.

== Effects on the economy ==
In the later half of the 19th century, both the direct administration of India by the British Crown and the technological change ushered in by the industrial revolution, had the effect of closely intertwining the economies of India and Great Britain. In fact, many of the major changes in transport and communications (that are typically associated with Crown Rule of India) had already begun before the Mutiny. Since Dalhousie had embraced the technological change then rampant in Great Britain, India too saw rapid development of all those technologies. Railways, roads, canals, and bridges were rapidly built in India and telegraph links equally rapidly established in order that raw materials, such as cotton, from India's hinterland could be transported more efficiently to ports, such as Bombay, for subsequent export to England. Likewise, finished goods from England were transported back just as efficiently, for sale in the burgeoning Indian markets. However, unlike Britain itself, where the market risks for the infrastructure development were borne by private investors, in India it was the taxpayers—primarily farmers and farm-labourers—who endured the risks, which, in the end, amounted to £50 million. In spite of these costs, very little skilled employment was created for Indians. By 1920, with a history of 60 years of its construction, only 10 percent of the "superior posts" in the railways were held by Indians.

The rush of technology was also changing the agricultural economy in India: by the last decade of the 19th century, a large fraction of some raw materials—not only cotton, but also some food-grains—were being exported to faraway markets. Consequently, many small farmers, dependent on the whims of those markets, lost land, animals, and equipment to money-lenders. More tellingly, the latter half of the 19th century also saw an increase in the number of large-scale famines in India. Although famines were not new to the subcontinent, these were particularly severe with millions dying, and with many critics both British and Indian laying the blame at the doorsteps of the lumbering colonial administrations.

The period of British rule saw India's population increase more than twofold from 170 million in 1750 to 425 million in 1950, reflecting major improvements in public health and nutrition, despite cyclical famines. Mortality rates fell between 1920 and 1945, primarily due to biological immunisation. Other factors included rising incomes and better living conditions, improved nutrition, environmental improvements, and better health policies and medical care. Severe overcrowding in the cities caused major public health problems.

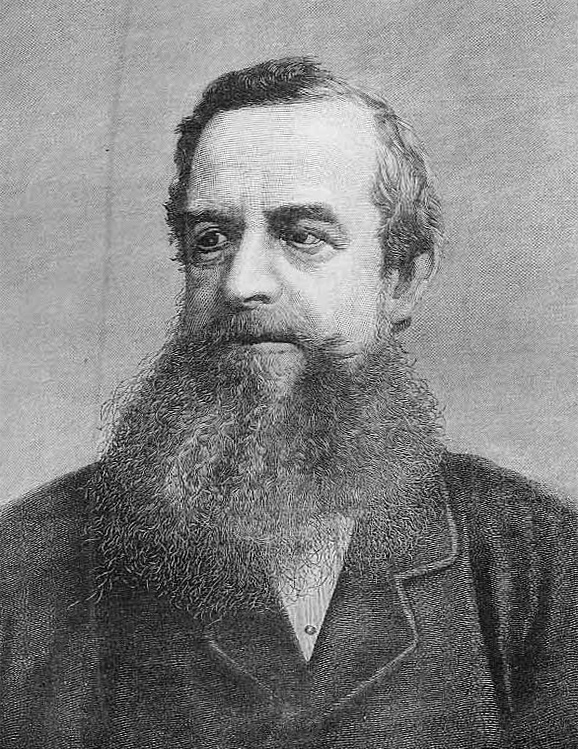
Lord Ripon, the Liberal Viceroy of India, who instituted the Famine Code

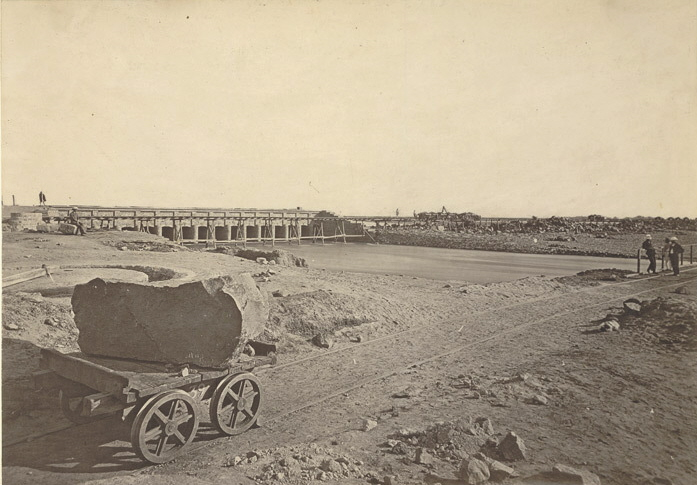
The Agra canal (c. 1873), a year away from completion. The canal was closed to navigation in 1904 to increase irrigation and aid in famine-prevention.

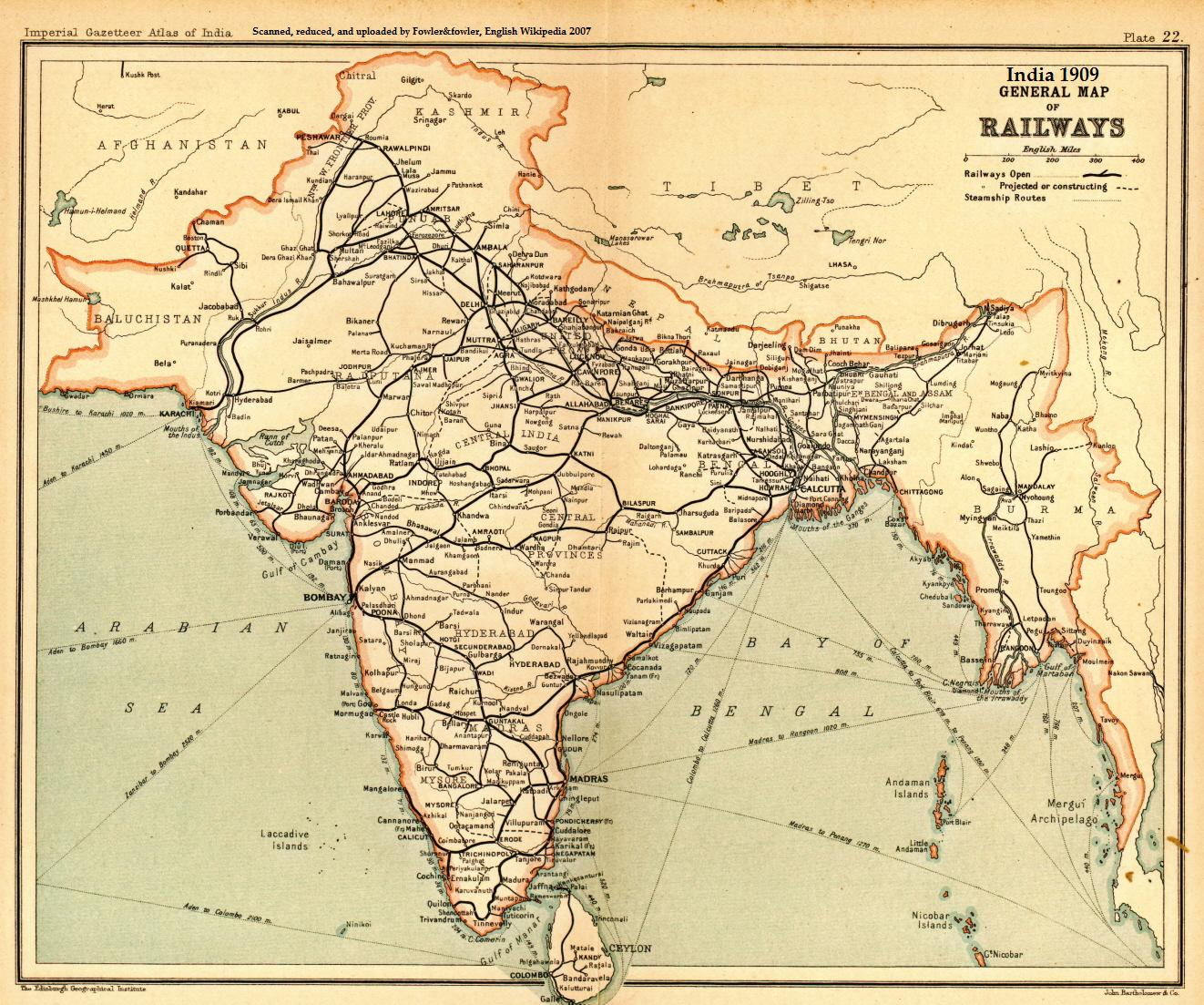
Railway map of India in 1909. Railway construction in India had begun in 1853.

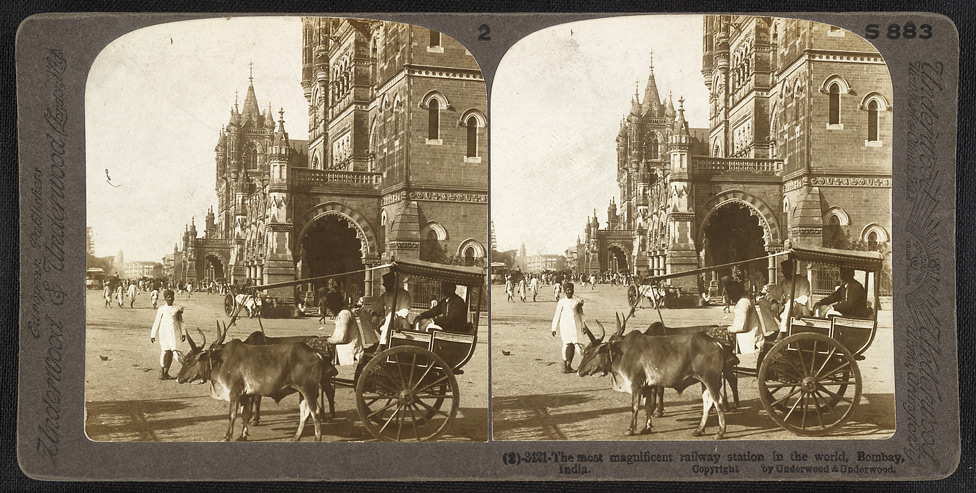
A 1903 stereographic image of Victoria Terminus, Bombay, by Underwood and Underwood. The station was completed in 1888.

In terms of the longer lasting effects and legacies of the economic impact of the British Raj, the impact predominantly stems from the irregular investment of areas of infrastructure. Simon Carey explains how the investment into Indian society was 'narrowly focused' and favoured the growth of transportation of goods and workers. Therefore, India has since seen an uneven economic development of society. For example, Acemoglu et al. (2001) identify how the inability of certain areas of rural India to cope with disease and famine best explain this uneven development of the nation. Carey also points out that a lasting impact of the British Raj is the transformation of India into an agricultural trading economy. Therefore, some areas of India, predominantly in affluent urban areas, have benefited from the legacies of the British Raj in the long term due to the transformation of Indian economic culture to a production based economy. However, the majority of Indian society has experienced a negative impact of the British Raj, especially in rural and suburban areas, due to the focus of investment into transport such as railways and canals rather than into healthcare and primary education.

== Beginnings of self-government ==
The first steps were taken toward self-government in British India in the late 19th century with the appointment of Indian counsellors to advise the British viceroy and the establishment of provincial councils with Indian members; the British subsequently widened participation in legislative councils with the Indian Councils Act 1892. Municipal Corporations and District Boards were created for local administration; they included elected Indian members

The Indian Councils Act 1909 – also known as the Morley-Minto Reforms (John Morley was the secretary of state for India, and Gilbert Elliot, fourth earl of Minto, was viceroy) – gave Indians limited roles in the central and provincial legislatures, known as legislative councils. Indians had previously been appointed to legislative councils, but after the reforms some were elected to them. At the centre, the majority of council members continued to be government-appointed officials, and the viceroy was in no way responsible to the legislature. At the provincial level, the elected members, together with unofficial appointees, outnumbered the appointed officials, but responsibility of the governor to the legislature was not contemplated. Morley made it clear in introducing the legislation to the British Parliament that parliamentary self-government was not the goal of the British government.

The Morley-Minto Reforms were a milestone. Step by step, the elective principle was introduced for membership in Indian legislative councils. The "electorate" was limited, however, to a small group of upper-class Indians. These elected members increasingly became an "opposition" to the "official government". The Communal electorates were later extended to other communities and made a political factor of the Indian tendency toward group identification through religion.

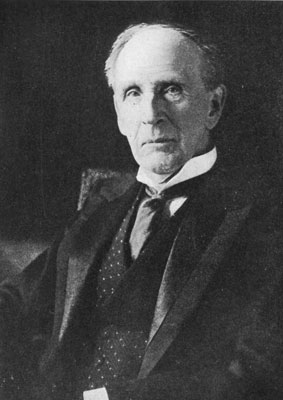
John Morley, the Secretary of State for India from 1905 to 1910, and Gladstonian Liberal. The Indian Councils Act 1909, also known as the Minto-Morley Reforms allowed Indians to be elected to the Legislative Council.

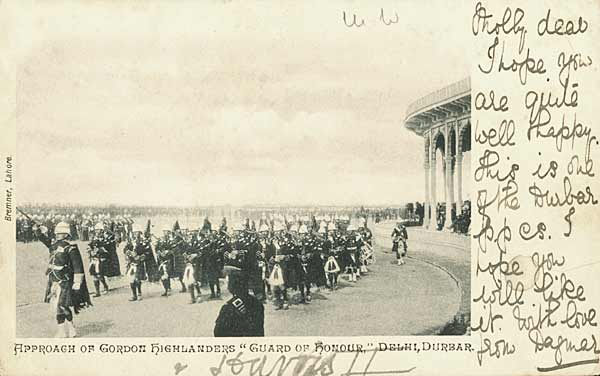
Picture post card of the Gordon Highlanders marching past King George V and Queen Mary at the Delhi Durbar on 12 December 1911, when the King was crowned Emperor of India.

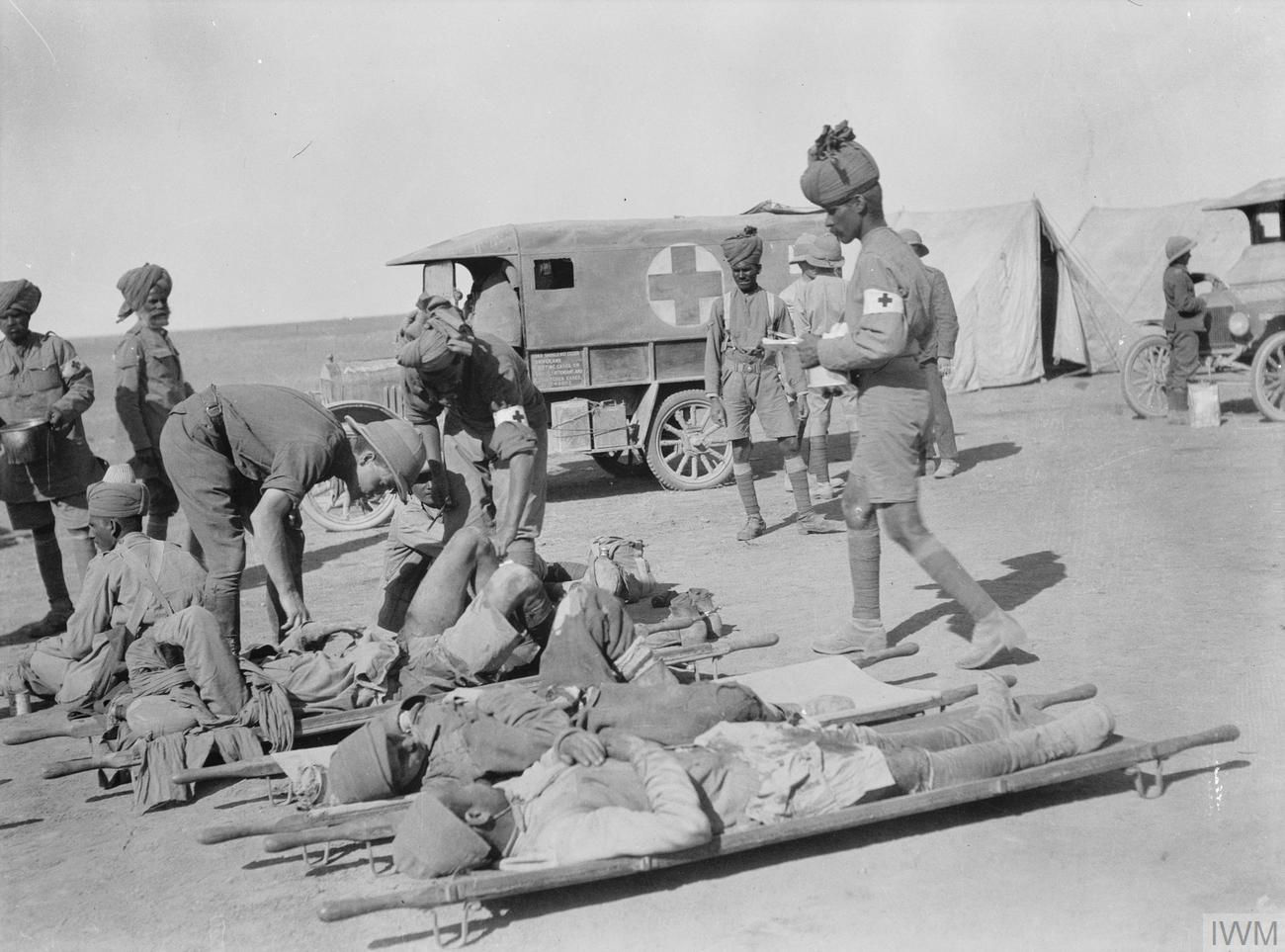
Indian medical orderlies attending to wounded soldiers with the Mesopotamian Expeditionary Force in Mesopotamia during World War I.

== World War I and its causes ==
World War I would prove to be a watershed in the imperial relationship between Britain and India. 1.4 million Indian and British soldiers of the British Indian Army would take part in the war, and their participation would have a wider cultural fallout: news of Indian soldiers fighting and dying with British soldiers, as well as soldiers from dominions like Canada, Australia and New Zealand, would travel to distant corners of the world both in newsprint and by the new medium of the radio. India's international profile would thereby rise and would continue to rise during the 1920s. It was to lead, among other things, to India, under its own name, becoming a founding member of the League of Nations in 1920 and participating, under the name "Les Indes Anglaises" (The British Indies), in the 1920 Summer Olympics in Antwerp. Back in India, especially among the leaders of the Indian National Congress, it would lead to calls for greater self-government for Indians through sport.

In 1916, in the face of new strength demonstrated by the nationalists with the signing of the Lucknow Pact and the founding of the Home Rule leagues, and the realisation, after the disaster in the Mesopotamian campaign, that the war would likely last longer, the new viceroy, Lord Chelmsford, cautioned that the Government of India needed to be more responsive to Indian opinion. Towards the end of the year, after discussions with the government in London, he suggested that the British demonstrate their good faith – in light of the Indian war role – through a number of public actions, including awards of titles and honours to princes, granting of commissions in the army to Indians, and removal of the much-reviled cotton excise duty, but most importantly, an announcement of Britain's future plans for India and an indication of some concrete steps. After more discussion, in August 1917, the new Liberal Secretary of State for India, Edwin Montagu, announced the British aim of "increasing association of Indians in every branch of the administration, and the gradual development of self-governing institutions, with a view to the progressive realisation of responsible government in India as an integral part of the British Empire." This envisioned reposing confidence in the educated Indians, so far disdained as an unrepresentative minority, who were described by Montague as "intellectually our children". The pace of the reforms was to be determined by Britain as and when the Indians were seen to have earned it. However, although the plan envisioned limited self-government at first only in the provinces – with India emphatically within the British Empire – it represented the first British proposal for any form of representative government in a non-white colony.

Earlier, at the onset of World War I, the reassignment of most of the British army in India to Europe and Mesopotamia had led the previous viceroy, Lord Harding, to worry about the "risks involved in denuding India of troops." Revolutionary violence had already been a concern in British India; consequently, in 1915, to strengthen its powers during what it saw was a time of increased vulnerability, the Government of India passed the Defence of India Act, which allowed it to intern politically dangerous dissidents without due process and added to the power it already had – under the 1910 Press Act – both to imprison journalists without trial and to censor the press. Now, as constitutional reform began to be discussed in earnest, the British began to consider how new moderate Indians could be brought into the fold of constitutional politics and, simultaneously, how the hand of established constitutionalists could be strengthened. However, since the reform plan was devised during a time when extremist violence had ebbed as a result of increased wartime governmental control and it now feared a revival of revolutionary violence, the government also began to consider how some of its wartime powers could be extended into peacetime.

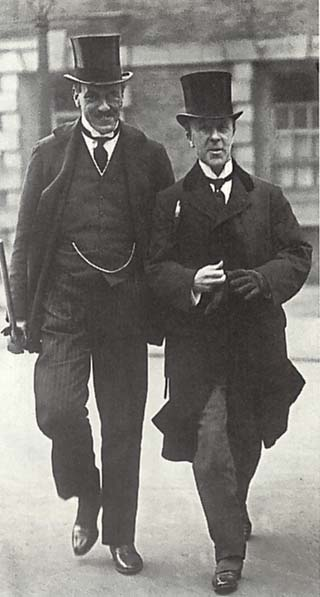
Edwin Montagu, left, the Secretary of State for India, whose report led to the Government of India Act 1919, also known as the Montford Reforms or the Montagu-Chelmsford Reforms.

Consequently, in 1917, even as Edwin Montagu announced the new constitutional reforms, a sedition committee chaired by a British judge, Mr. S. A. T. Rowlatt, was tasked with investigating wartime revolutionary conspiracies and the German and Bolshevik links to the violence in India, with the unstated goal of extending the government's wartime powers. The Rowlatt Committee presented its report in July 1918 and identified three regions of conspiratorial insurgency: Bengal, the Bombay Presidency, and the Punjab. To combat subversive acts in these regions, the committee recommended that the government use emergency powers akin to its wartime authority, which included the ability to try cases of sedition by a panel of three judges and without juries, exaction of securities from suspects, governmental overseeing of residences of suspects, and the power for provincial governments to detain suspects without trial.

With the end of World War I, there was also a change in the economic climate. By year's end 1919, 1.5 million Indians had served in the armed services in either combatant or non-combatant roles, and India had provided £146 million in revenue for the war. The increased taxes, coupled with disruptions in both domestic and international trade, had the effect of approximately doubling the index of overall prices in India between 1914 and 1920. Returning war veterans, especially in the Punjab, created a growing unemployment crisis, and post-war inflation led to food riots in Bombay, Madras, and Bengal provinces, a situation that was made only worse by the failure of the 1918–19 monsoon and by profiteering and speculation. The global influenza epidemic and the Bolshevik Revolution of 1917 added to the general jitters; the former among the population already experiencing economic woes, and the latter among government officials, fearing a similar revolution in India.

To combat what it saw as a coming crisis, the government now drafted the Rowlatt Committee's recommendations into two Rowlatt Bills. Although the bills were authorised for legislative consideration by Edwin Montagu, they were done so unwillingly, with the accompanying declaration, "I loathe the suggestion at first sight of preserving the Defence of India Act in peace time to such an extent as Rowlatt and his friends think necessary." In the ensuing discussion and vote in the Imperial Legislative Council, all Indian members voiced opposition to the bills. The Government of India was nevertheless able to use its "official majority" to ensure passage of the bills early in 1919. However, what it passed, in deference to the Indian opposition, was a lesser version of the first bill, which now allowed extrajudicial powers, but for a period of exactly three years and for the prosecution solely of "anarchical and revolutionary movements," dropping entirely the second bill involving modification of the Indian Penal Code. Even so, when it was passed, the new Rowlatt Act aroused widespread indignation throughout India and brought Mohandas Gandhi to the forefront of the nationalist movement.

=== Montagu–Chelmsford Report 1919 ===
Meanwhile, Montagu and Chelmsford themselves finally presented their report in July 1918 after a long fact-finding trip through India the previous winter. After more discussion by the government and parliament in Britain, and another tour by the Franchise and Functions Committee for the purpose of identifying who among the Indian population could vote in future elections, the Government of India Act 1919 (also known as the Montagu–Chelmsford Reforms) was passed in December 1919. The new act enlarged the provincial councils and converted the Imperial Legislative Council into an enlarged Central Legislative Assembly. It also repealed the Government of India's recourse to the "official majority" in unfavourable votes. Although departments like defence, foreign affairs, criminal law, communications and income tax were retained by the viceroy and the central government in New Delhi, other departments like public health, education, land revenue and local self-government were transferred to the provinces. The provinces themselves were now to be administered under a new dyarchical system, whereby some areas like education, agriculture, infrastructure development, and local self-government became the preserve of Indian ministers and legislatures, and ultimately the Indian electorates, while others like irrigation, land revenue, police, prisons, and control of media remained within the purview of the British governor and his executive council. The new act also made it easier for Indians to be admitted into the civil service and the army officer corps.

A greater number of Indians were now enfranchised, although, for voting at the national level, they constituted only 10% of the total adult male population, many of whom were still illiterate. In the provincial legislatures, the British continued to exercise some control by setting aside seats for special interests they considered cooperative or useful. In particular, rural candidates, generally sympathetic to British rule and less confrontational, were assigned more seats than their urban counterparts. Seats were also reserved for non-Brahmins, landowners, businessmen, and college graduates. The principal of "communal representation", an integral part of the Minto–Morley Reforms, and, more recently of the Congress-Muslim League Lucknow Pact, was reaffirmed, with seats being reserved for Muslims, Sikhs, Indian Christians, Anglo-Indians, and domiciled Europeans, in both provincial and Imperial legislative councils. The Montagu–Chelmsford reforms offered Indians the most significant opportunity yet for exercising legislative power, especially at the provincial level; however, that opportunity was also restricted by the still limited number of eligible voters, by the small budgets available to provincial legislatures, and by the presence of rural and special interest seats that were seen as instruments of British control.

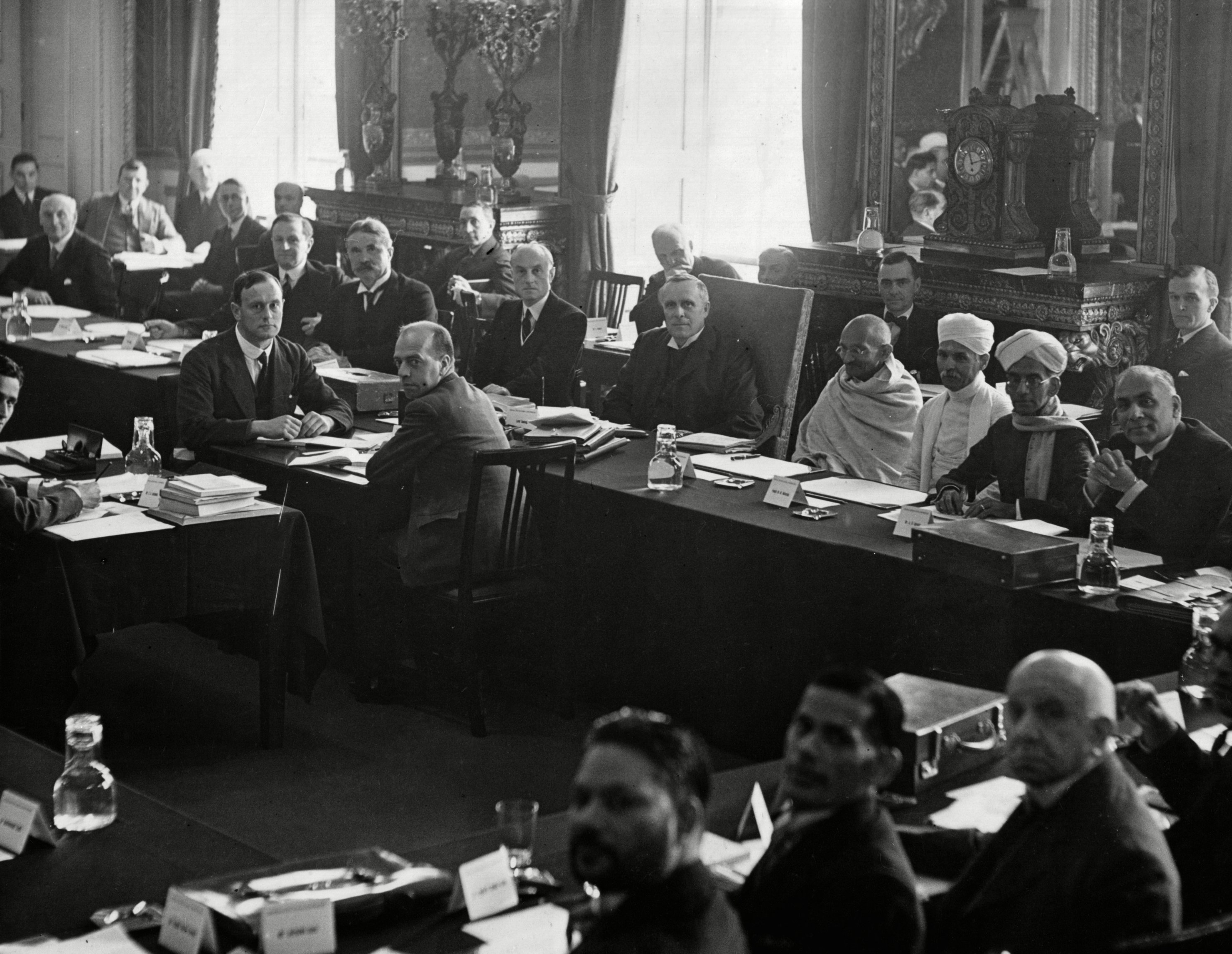
British Prime Minister MacDonald to the right of Gandhi at the Second Round Table Conference in London, October 1931.

=== Round Table Conferences 1930–31–32 ===
The three Round Table Conferences of 1930–32 were a series of consultations organised by the British government to discuss constitutional reforms in India. They were conducted on the advice of Muslim leader Muhammad Ali Jinnah to Viceroy Lord Irwin and Prime Minister Ramsay MacDonald, and the recommendation of the report submitted by the Simon Commission in May 1930. Demands for swaraj, or self-rule, in India had been growing increasingly strong. By the 1930s, many British politicians believed that India needed to move towards dominion status. However, there were significant disagreements between the Indian and the British leaders that the conferences could not resolve.

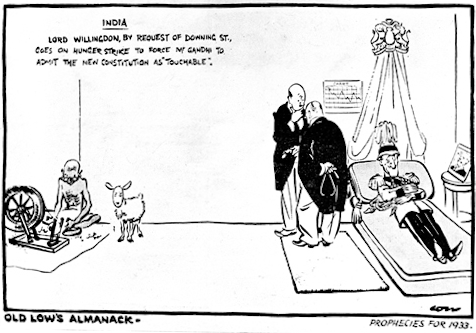
A cartoon from 1932 depicting Viscount Willingdon on a hunger strike against Gandhi

=== Willingdon imprisons leaders of Congress ===
In 1932 the Viceroy, Lord Willingdon, after the failure of the three Round Table Conferences (India) in London, now confronted Gandhi's Congress in action. The India Office told Willingdon that he should conciliate only those elements of Indian opinion that were willing to work with the Raj. That did not include Gandhi and the Indian National Congress, which launched its Civil Disobedience Movement on 4 January 1932. Therefore, Willingdon took decisive action. He imprisoned Gandhi. He outlawed the Congress; he rounded up all members of the Working Committee and the Provincial Committees and imprisoned them; and he banned Congress youth organisations. In total he imprisoned 80,000 Indian activists. Without most of their leaders, protests were uneven and disorganised, boycotts were ineffective, illegal youth organisations proliferated but were ineffective, more women became involved, and there was terrorism, especially in the North-West Frontier Province. Gandhi remained in prison until 1933. Willingdon relied on his military secretary, Hastings Ismay, for his personal safety.

=== Communal Award: 1932 ===
MacDonald, trying to resolve the critical issue of how Indians would be represented, on 16 August 1932 announced the Communal Award, which retained separate electorates for Muslims, Sikhs, and Europeans in India and increased the number of provinces that offered separate electorates to Anglo-Indians and Indian Christians. The Depressed Classes (now known as the Dalits) obtained a separate electorate. Gandhi, representing the Indian National Congress during negotiations, rejected separate electorates for the Depressed Classes, Europeans, Anglo-Indians, and Indian Christians because, according to historian Helen Nugent, he believed those separate electorates would weaken Congress' claim to be nationally representative. The award went into effect anyway.

== Government of India Act (1935) ==
In 1935, after the failure of the Round Table Conferences, the British Parliament approved the Government of India Act 1935, which authorised the establishment of independent legislative assemblies in all provinces of British India, the creation of a central government incorporating both the British provinces and the princely states, and the protection of Muslim minorities. The future Constitution of independent India would owe a great deal to the text of this act. The act also provided for a bicameral national parliament and an executive branch under the purview of the British government. Although the national federation was never realised, nationwide elections for provincial assemblies were held in 1937. Despite initial hesitation, the Congress took part in the elections and won victories in seven of the eleven provinces of British India, and Congress governments, with wide powers, were formed in these provinces. In Great Britain, these victories were to later turn the tide for the idea of Indian independence.

== World War II ==
India played a major role in the Allied war effort against both Japan and Germany. It provided over 2 million soldiers, who fought numerous campaigns in the Middle East, and in the India-Burma front and also supplied billions of pounds to the British war effort. The Muslim and Sikh populations were strongly supportive of the British war effort, but the Hindu population was divided. Congress opposed the war, and tens of thousands of its leaders were imprisoned in 1942–45. A major famine in eastern India led to hundreds of thousands of deaths by starvation, and remains a highly controversial issue regarding Churchill's reluctance to provide emergency food relief.

With the outbreak of World War II in 1939, the viceroy, Lord Linlithgow, declared war on India's behalf without consulting Indian leaders, leading the Congress provincial ministries to resign in protest. The Muslim League, in contrast, supported Britain in the war effort; however, it now took the view that Muslims would be unfairly treated in an independent India dominated by the Congress. Hindus not affiliated with the Congress typically supported the war. The two major Sikh factions, the Unionists and the Akali Dal, supported Britain and successfully urged large numbers of Sikhs to volunteer for the army.

=== Quit India movement or the Bharat Chhodo Andolan ===
The British sent a high level Cripps Mission in 1942 to secure Indian nationalists' co-operation in the war effort in exchange for postwar independence and dominion status. Congress demanded immediate independence and the mission failed. Gandhi then launched the Quit India Movement in August 1942, demanding the immediate withdrawal of the British from India or face nationwide civil disobedience. Along with thousands of other Congress leaders, Gandhi was immediately imprisoned, and the country erupted in violent local episodes led by students and later by peasant political groups, especially in Eastern United Provinces, Bihar, and western Bengal. According to John F. Riddick, from 9 August 1942 to 21 September 1942, the Quit India movement:

attacked 550 post offices, 250 railway stations, damaged many rail lines, destroyed 70 police stations, and burned or damaged 85 other government buildings. There were about 2,500 instances of telegraph wires being cut....The Government of India deployed 57 battalions of British troops to restore order.

The police and army crushed the resistance in months. Nationalist leaders were imprisoned until the end of World War 2.

Ultimately, the British government realised that India was ungovernable in the long run, and the question for the postwar era became how to exit gracefully and peacefully.

In 1945, when the World War 2 had almost come to an end, the Labour Party of the United Kingdom won elections with a promise to provide independence to India. The jailed political prisoners were released the same year.

=== Bose and the Indian National Army (INA) ===
Subhas Chandra Bose, who had been ousted from the Congress Party in 1939 following differences with the more conservative high command, turned to Germany and Japan for help with liberating India by force. With Japanese support, he organised the Indian National Army, composed largely of Indian soldiers of the British Indian army who had been captured at Singapore by the Japanese, including many Sikhs as well as Hindus and Muslims. Japan's secret service had promoted unrest in Southeast Asia to destabilise the British war effort, and came to support a number of puppet and provisional governments in regions under their occupation, such as those of Burma, the Philippines and Vietnam; similarly supported was the Provisional Government of Azad Hind (Free India), presided over by Bose. Bose's effort, however, was short lived; after the reverses of 1944, the reinforced British Indian Army in 1945 first halted and then reversed the Japanese U Go offensive, beginning the successful part of the Burma Campaign.

Bose's Indian National Army surrendered with the recapture of Singapore; Bose died in a plane crash soon thereafter.

The British demanded trials for INA officers, but public opinion—including Congress and even the Indian Army—saw the INA as fighting for Indian independence and demanded a termination. The British eventually backtracked in the face of opposition by the Congress. These trials became a galvanising point in the Indian Independence movement for the Indian National Congress.

=== Finances ===
Britain borrowed everywhere it could and made heavy purchases of equipment and supplies in India during the war. Previously India owed Britain large sums; now it was reversed. Britain's sterling balances around the world amounted to £3.4 billion in 1945; India's share was £1.3 billion (equivalent to $US 74 billion in 2016 dollars.) In this way the Raj treasury accumulated very large sterling reserves of British pounds that was owed to it by the British treasury. However, Britain treated this as a long-term loan with no interest and no specified repayment date. Just when the money would be made available by London was an issue, for the British treasury was nearly empty by 1945. India's balances totalled to Rs. 17.24 billion in March 1946; of that sum Rs. 15.12 billion [£1.134 billion] was split between India and Pakistan when they became independent in August 1947. They finally got the money and India spent all its share by 1957 which included buying back British owned assets in India.

== Transfer of power ==
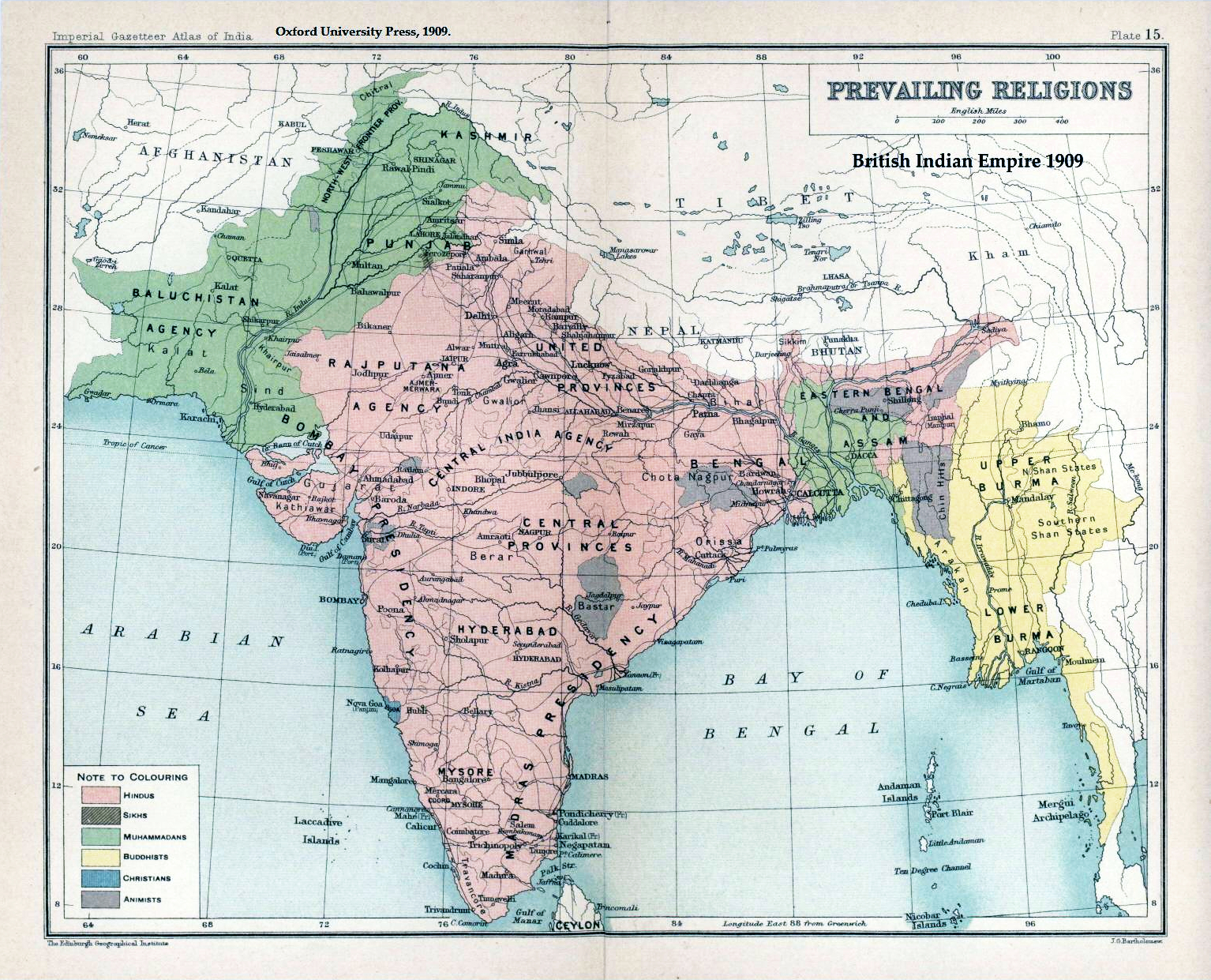
1909 Prevailing Religions, Map of British Indian Empire, 1909, showing the prevailing majority religions of the population for different districts.

The All India Azad Muslim Conference gathered in Delhi in April 1940 to voice its support for an independent and united India. Its members included several Islamic organisations in India, as well as 1400 nationalist Muslim delegates. The pro-separatist All-India Muslim League worked to try to silence those nationalist Muslims who stood against the partition of India, often using "intimidation and coercion". The murder of the All India Azad Muslim Conference leader Allah Bakhsh Soomro also made it easier for the All-India Muslim League to demand the creation of a Pakistan.

In January 1946, a number of mutinies broke out in the armed services, starting with that of RAF servicemen frustrated with their slow repatriation to Britain. The mutinies came to a head with mutiny of the Royal Indian Navy in Bombay in February 1946, followed by others in Calcutta, Madras, and Karachi. Although the mutinies were rapidly suppressed, they found much public support in India and spurred the new Labour government in Britain to action, and leading to the Cabinet Mission to India led by the Secretary of State for India, Lord Pethick Lawrence, and including Sir Stafford Cripps, who had visited four years before.

Also in early 1946, new elections were called in India in which the Congress won electoral victories in eight of the eleven provinces. However, the negotiations between the Congress and the Muslim League stumbled over the issue of the partition. Jinnah proclaimed 16 August 1946, Direct Action Day, with the stated goal of peacefully highlighting the demand for a Muslim homeland in British India. The following day, Hindu-Muslim riots broke out in Calcutta and they quickly spread throughout India. Although the Government of India and the Congress were both shaken by the course of events, in September, a Congress-led interim government was installed, with Jawaharlal Nehru serving as united India's prime minister.

Later that year, the Labour government in Britain, its exchequer exhausted by the recently concluded World War II, decided to end British rule of India, and in early 1947, Britain announced its intention to transfer power no later than June 1948.

As independence approached, the violence between Hindus and Muslims in the provinces of Punjab and Bengal continued unabated. With the British army unprepared for the potential for increased violence, the new viceroy, Louis Mountbatten, advanced the date for the transfer of power, allowing less than six months for a mutually agreed plan for independence. In June 1947, the nationalist leaders, including Nehru and Abul Kalam Azad on behalf of the Congress, Jinnah representing the pro-separatist Muslim League, B. R. Ambedkar representing the Untouchable community, and Master Tara Singh representing the Sikhs, agreed to a partition of the country in opposition to Gandhi's views. In the years leading up to the partition of India, the pro-separatist All-India Muslim League violently drove out Hindus and Sikhs from the western Punjab.

Many millions of Muslim, Sikh, and Hindu refugees trekked across the newly drawn borders. In Punjab, where the new border lines divided the Sikh regions in half, massive bloodshed followed; in Bengal and Bihar, where Gandhi's presence assuaged communal tempers, the violence was more limited. In all, anywhere between 250,000 and 500,000 people on both sides of the new borders died in the violence. On 14 August 1947, the new Dominion of Pakistan came into being, with Muhammad Ali Jinnah sworn in as its first Governor General in Karachi. The following day, 15 August 1947, India, now a smaller Union of India, became an independent country with official ceremonies taking place in New Delhi, with Jawaharlal Nehru assuming the office of the prime minister, and the viceroy, Louis Mountbatten, stayed on as its first Governor General.

== See also ==
- Company rule in India
- British East India Company

== Notes ==
=== Surveys and reference books ===
- Bandyopadhyay, Sekhar (2004), From Plassey to Partition: A History of Modern India, Orient Longmans. Pp. xx, 548., ISBN 81-250-2596-0.
- Brown, Judith M. (1994), Modern India: The Origins of an Asian Democracy, Oxford University Press. Pp. xiii, 474, ISBN 0-19-873113-2.
- Buckland, C.E. Dictionary of Indian Biography (1906) 495pp full text
- Copland, Ian (2001), India 1885–1947: The Unmaking of an Empire (Seminar Studies in History Series), Pearson Longmans. Pp. 160, ISBN 0-582-38173-8.
- Judd, Dennis (2004), The Lion and the Tiger: The Rise and Fall of the British Raj, 1600–1947, Oxford University Press. Pp. xiii, 280, ISBN 0-19-280358-1.
- Keay, John (2000), India: A History, New York: Atlantic Monthly Press, ISBN 0-87113-800-X
- Ludden, David (2002), India And South Asia: A Short History, Oxford: Oneworld Publications. Pp. xii, 306, ISBN 1-85168-237-6, archived from the original on 16 July 2011
- Markovits, Claude, ed. (2005), A History of Modern India 1480–1950 (Anthem South Asian Studies), Anthem Press. Pp. 607, ISBN 1-84331-152-6.
- Metcalf, Barbara; Metcalf, Thomas R. (2006), A Concise History of Modern India (Cambridge Concise Histories), Cambridge University Press. Pp. xxxiii, 372, ISBN 0-521-68225-8.
- Peers, Douglas M. (2006), India under Colonial Rule 1700–1885, Pearson Longmans. Pp. xvi, 163, ISBN 0-582-31738-X.
- Rees, Rosemary. India 1900–47 (Heineman, 2006), textbook.
- Riddick, John F. Who Was Who in British India (1998); 5000 entries excerpt
- Robb, Peter (2004), A History of India (Palgrave Essential Histories), Palgrave Macmillan. Pp. xiv, 344, ISBN 0-333-69129-6.
- Sarkar, Sumit (1983), Modern India: 1885–1947, Macmillan India Ltd. Pp. xiv, 486, ISBN 0-333-90425-7.
- Spear, Percival (1990), A History of India, Volume 2, Penguin Books. Pp. 298, ISBN 0-14-013836-6.
- Stein, Burton (2010) [First published 1998], Arnold, David (ed.), A History of India (2nd ed.), John Wiley & Sons, ISBN 978-1-4051-9509-6.
- Wolpert, Stanley (2003), A New History of India, Oxford University Press. Pp. 544, ISBN 0-19-516678-7.

=== Monographs and collections ===
- Bayly, C. A. (1990), Indian Society and the Making of the British Empire (The New Cambridge History of India), Cambridge University Press. Pp. 248, ISBN 0-521-38650-0.
- Bayly, C. A. (2000), Empire and Information: Intelligence Gathering and Social Communication in India, 1780–1870 (Cambridge Studies in Indian History and Society), Cambridge University Press. Pp. 426, ISBN 0-521-66360-1
- Brown, Judith M.; Louis, Wm. Roger, eds. (2001), Oxford History of the British Empire: The Twentieth Century, Oxford University Press. Pp. 800, ISBN 0-19-924679-3
- Chandavarkar, Rajnarayan (1998), Imperial Power and Popular Politics: Class, Resistance and the State in India, 1850–1950, (Cambridge Studies in Indian History & Society). Cambridge University Press. Pp. 400, ISBN 0-521-59692-0.
- Copland, Ian (2002), Princes of India in the Endgame of Empire, 1917–1947, (Cambridge Studies in Indian History & Society). Cambridge University Press. Pp. 316, ISBN 0-521-89436-0.
- Gilmartin, David. 1988. Empire and Islam: Punjab and the Making of Pakistan. Berkeley: University of California Press. 258 pages. ISBN 0-520-06249-3.
- Gould, William (2004), Hindu Nationalism and the Language of Politics in Late Colonial India, (Cambridge Studies in Indian History and Society). Cambridge University Press. Pp. 320, ISBN 0-521-83061-3.
- Hyam, Ronald (2007), Britain's Declining Empire: The Road to Decolonisation 1918–1968., Cambridge University Press., ISBN 978-0-521-86649-1.
- Jalal, Ayesha (1993), The Sole Spokesman: Jinnah, the Muslim League and the Demand for Pakistan, Cambridge University Press, 334 pages, ISBN 0-521-45850-1.
- Khan, Yasmin (2007), The Great Partition: The Making of India and Pakistan, Yale University Press, 250 pages, ISBN 978-0-300-12078-3
- Khosla, G. D. (2001), "Stern Reckoning", in Page, David; Inder Singh, Anita; Moon, Penderal; Khosla, G. D.; Hasan, Mushirul (eds.), The Partition Omnibus: Prelude to Partition/the Origins of the Partition of India 1936-1947/Divide and Quit/Stern Reckoning, Oxford University Press, ISBN 0-19-565850-7
- Lebra, Joyce C. (1977), Japanese Trained Armies in South-East Asia, Columbia University Press, ISBN 0-231-03995-6
- Low, D. A. (1993), Eclipse of Empire, Cambridge University Press. Pp. xvi, 366, ISBN 0-521-45754-8.
- Low, D. A. (2002), Britain and Indian Nationalism: The Imprint of Amibiguity 1929–1942, Cambridge University Press. Pp. 374, ISBN 0-521-89261-9.
- Low, D. A., ed. (2004) [1977], Congress & the Raj: Facets of the Indian Struggle 1917–47, Oxford University Press. Pp. xviii, 513, ISBN 0-19-568367-6.
- Marston, Daniel (2014), The Indian Army and End of the Raj, Cambridge University Press, ISBN 978-0-521-89975-8
- Metcalf, Thomas R. (1991), The Aftermath of Revolt: India, 1857–1870, Riverdale Co. Pub. Pp. 352, ISBN 81-85054-99-1
- Metcalf, Thomas R. (1997), Ideologies of the Raj, Cambridge University Press, Pp. 256, ISBN 0-521-58937-1
- Porter, Andrew, ed. (2001), Oxford History of the British Empire: Nineteenth Century, Oxford University Press. Pp. 800, ISBN 0-19-924678-5
- Ramusack, Barbara (2004), The Indian Princes and their States (The New Cambridge History of India), Cambridge University Press. Pp. 324, ISBN 0-521-03989-4
- Shaikh, Farzana. 1989. Community and Consensus in Islam: Muslim Representation in Colonial India, 1860—1947. Cambridge, UK: Cambridge University Press. 272 pages. ISBN 0-521-36328-4.
- Singh, Harkirat (2003), INA Trials and the Raj, Atlantic Publishers, ISBN 81-269-0316-3
- Wolpert, Stanley (2006), Shameful Flight: The Last Years of the British Empire in India, Oxford University Press, ISBN 978-0-19-515198-5.

=== Articles in journals or collections ===
- Acemoglu, Daron; Johnson, Simon; Robinson, James A. (December 2001), "The Colonial Origins of Comparative Development: An Empirical Investigation", The American Economic Review, 91 (5): 1369–1401, doi:10.1257/aer.91.5.1369, hdl:1721.1/63407, JSTOR 2677930
- Banthia, Jayant; Dyson, Tim (December 1999), "Smallpox in Nineteenth-Century India", Population and Development Review, 25 (4), Population Council: 649–689, doi:10.1111/j.1728-4457.1999.00649.x, JSTOR 172481, PMID 22053410
- Brown, Judith M. (2001), "India", in Brown, Judith M.; Louis, Wm. Roger (eds.), Oxford History of the British Empire: The Twentieth Century, Oxford University Press, pp. 421–446, ISBN 0-19-924679-3
- Carey, Simon (2012), "The Legacy of British Colonialism in India Post 1947", The New Zealand Review of Economics and Finance, 2: 37–47, ISSN 2324-478X
- Chaudhuri, Niradh C. (December 1953), "Subhas Chandra Bose: His Legacy and Legend", Pacific Affairs, 26 (4): 349–357, JSTOR 2752872
- Derbyshire, I. D. (1987), "Economic Change and the Railways in North India, 1860–1914", Population Studies, 21 (3), Cambridge University Press: 521–545, doi:10.1017/s0026749x00009197, JSTOR 312641, S2CID 146480332
- Dyson, Tim (March 1991), "On the Demography of South Asian Famines: Part I", Population Studies, 45 (1), Taylor & Francis: 5–25, doi:10.1080/0032472031000145056, JSTOR 2174991, PMID 11622922
- Dyson, Tim (July 1991), "On the Demography of South Asian Famines: Part II", Population Studies, 45 (2), Taylor & Francis: 279–297, doi:10.1080/0032472031000145446, JSTOR 2174784, PMID 11622922
- Gilmartin, David (November 1994), "Scientific Empire and Imperial Science: Colonialism and Irrigation Technology in the Indus Basin", The Journal of Asian Studies, 53 (4), Association for Asian Studies: 1127–1149, doi:10.2307/2059236, JSTOR 2059236, S2CID 161655860
- Goswami, Manu (October 1998), "From Swadeshi to Swaraj: Nation, Economy, Territory in Colonial South Asia, 1870 to 1907", Comparative Studies in Society and History, 40 (4), Cambridge University Press: 609–636, doi:10.1017/s0010417598001674, JSTOR 179304, S2CID 145013372
- Harnetty, Peter (July 1991), "'Deindustrialization' Revisited: The Handloom Weavers of the Central Provinces of India, c. 1800–1947", Modern Asian Studies, 25 (3), Cambridge University Press: 455–510, doi:10.1017/S0026749X00013901, JSTOR 312614, S2CID 144468476
- Klein, Ira (1988), "Plague, Policy and Popular Unrest in British India", Modern Asian Studies, 22 (4), Cambridge University Press: 723–755, doi:10.1017/s0026749x00015729, JSTOR 312523, PMID 11617732, S2CID 42173746
- Klein, Ira (July 2000), "Materialism, Mutiny and Modernization in British India", Modern Asian Studies, 34 (3), Cambridge University Press: 545–580, doi:10.1017/S0026749X00003656, JSTOR 313141, S2CID 143348610
- Moore, Robin J. (2001a), "Imperial India, 1858–1914", in Porter, Andrew (ed.), Oxford History of the British Empire: The Nineteenth Century, Oxford University Press, pp. 422–446, ISBN 0-19-924678-5
- Moore, Robin J. (2001b), "India in the 1940s", in Winks, Robin (ed.), Oxford History of the British Empire: Historiography, Oxford University Press, pp. 231–242, ISBN 0-19-924680-7
- Overby, Stephanie (17 May 2019), "The top 10 IT outsourcing service providers of the year", CIO
- Ray, Rajat Kanta (July 1995), "Asian Capital in the Age of European Domination: The Rise of the Bazaar, 1800–1914", Modern Asian Studies, 29 (3), Cambridge University Press: 449–554, doi:10.1017/S0026749X00013986, JSTOR 312868, S2CID 145744242
- Raychaudhuri, Tapan (2001), "India, 1858 to the 1930s", in Winks, Robin (ed.), Oxford History of the British Empire: Historiography, Oxford University Press, pp. 214–230, ISBN 0-19-924680-7
- Robb, Peter (May 1997), "The Colonial State and Constructions of Indian Identity: An Example on the Northeast Frontier in the 1880s", Modern Asian Studies, 31 (2), Cambridge University Press: 245–283, doi:10.1017/s0026749x0001430x, JSTOR 313030, S2CID 145299102
- Roy, Tirthankar (Summer 2002), "Economic History and Modern India: Redefining the Link", The Journal of Economic Perspectives, 16 (3), American Economic Association: 109–130, doi:10.1257/089533002760278749, JSTOR 3216953
- Sarkar, Benoy Kumar (March 1921), "A History of the Indian Nationalist Movement. by Verney Lovett", Political Science Quarterly (Review), 36 (1): 136–138, doi:10.2307/2142669, hdl:2027/coo1.ark:/13960/t3nw01g05, JSTOR 2142669
- Simmons, Colin (1985), "'De-Industrialization', Industrialization and the Indian Economy, c. 1850–1947", Modern Asian Studies, 19 (3), Cambridge University Press: 593–622, doi:10.1017/s0026749x00007745, JSTOR 312453, S2CID 144581168
- Talbot, Ian (2001), "Pakistan's Emergence", in Winks, Robin (ed.), Oxford History of the British Empire: Historiography, Oxford University Press, pp. 253–263, ISBN 0-19-924680-7
- Tinker, Hugh (1968), "India in the First World War and after.", Journal of Contemporary History, 3 (4), Sage Publications: 89–107, doi:10.1177/002200946800300407, ISSN 0022-0094, S2CID 150456443.
- Tomlinson, B. R. (2001), "Economics and Empire: The Periphery and the Imperial Economy", in Porter, Andrew (ed.), Oxford History of the British Empire: The Nineteenth Century, Oxford University Press, pp. 53–74, ISBN 0-19-924678-5
- Washbrook, D. A. (2001), "India, 1818–1860: The Two Faces of Colonialism", in Porter, Andrew (ed.), Oxford History of the British Empire: The Nineteenth Century, Oxford University Press, pp. 395–421, ISBN 0-19-924678-5
- Watts, Sheldon (November 1999), "British Development Policies and Malaria in India 1897-c. 1929", Past & Present (165), Oxford University Press: 141–181, doi:10.1093/past/165.1.141, JSTOR 651287, PMID 22043526
- Wylie, Diana (2001), "Disease, Diet, and Gender: Late Twentieth Century Perspectives on Empire", in Winks, Robin (ed.), Oxford History of the British Empire: Historiography, Oxford University Press, pp. 277–289, ISBN 0-19-924680-7

=== Classic histories and gazetteers ===
- Imperial Gazetteer of India vol. IV (1907), The Indian Empire, Administrative, Clarendon Press. Pp. xxx, 1 map, 552.
- Lovett, Sir Verney (1920), A History of the Indian Nationalist Movement, Frederick A. Stokes Company
- Majumdar, R. C.; Raychaudhuri, H. C.; Datta, Kalikinkar (1950), An Advanced History of India, Macmillan and Company Limited. 2nd edition. Pp. xiii, 1122, 7 maps, 5 coloured maps..
- Smith, Vincent A. (1921), India in the British Period: Being Part III of the Oxford History of India, Clarendon Press. 2nd edition. Pp. xxiv, 316 (469–784).

=== Tertiary sources ===
- Oldenburg, Philip (2007), "India: Movement for Freedom", Encarta Encyclopedia.
- Wolpert, Stanley (2007), "India: British Imperial Power 1858–1947 (Indian nationalism and the British response, 1885–1920; Prelude to Independence, 1920–1947)", Encyclopædia Britannica.
