= National Council of YMCAs of India =

The National Council of YMCAs of India is a part of the global YMCA fraternity which is known as World Alliance of YMCAs. It was formed in Madras on 21 February 1891 through the initiative of David McConaughy. The headquarters shifted to Calcutta in May 1902. In 1964 it shifted to New Delhi, its present location.

== History ==
The YMCA historically played a significant role in offering a more liberal alternative to British colonial models of physical development and nation-building.
