= Aniket Pote =

Indian kho kho player

Aniket Bhagwan Pote (born 7 November 1996) is an Indian kho kho player from Maharashtra. He plays for the India men's national kho kho team as an all-rounder. He was part of the Indian men's team that won the inaugural Kho Kho World Cup held at New Delhi in January 2025. He plays for Gujarat Giants in the Ultimate Kho Kho, a franchise based league tournament. In the first season, he played for Mumbai Khiladis.

== Early life and education ==
Pote is from Bandra East, Mumbai, Maharashtra. He is the son of late Bhagwan, is a bus driver and his mother Chhaya, who works as a house maid. His elder brother, Rupesh, is a driver in a private company while his younger brother, Swapnil, works as an office boy, also in a private firm. His father died of throat cancer. The family lives in a one-room rented house. He started playing kho kho in 2006. He played for local club Mahatma Gandhi Sports Academy. He is studying BA. He bagged employment with India Post, Maharashtra in sports quota.

== Career ==
In January 2025, Pote was part of the Indian team that won the inaugural Kho Kho World Cup at New Delhi. The Indian team were placed in Group A and defeated Nepal, Brazil, Peru and Bhutan in the group stages. In the quarterfinals, India defeated Sri Lanka and beat South Africa 62–42 in the semifinals. In the finals, India defeated Nepal 54–36 to lift their maiden World Cup.

His first major championship was the under 14 Nationals in 2008. He was part of the Indian team that won the 3rd Asian Kho-Kho Championship in 2016. He also played the 4th Asian Championship in 2023. He played international matches in London. He played five Senior National Kho Kho Championships for Maharashtra and has a gold and a silver medal. He took part in four Federation Cup tournaments.

=== Awards ===
- Pote received Shiv Chhatrapati Award in 2018.
- Maharashtra government promised Rs.2.25 crore and a government job for all the world Cup winners from Maharashtra.
