= Sinam Rokeson Singh =

Indian kho kho player

Sinam Rokeson Khuman Singh (born 2000) is an Indian kho kho player from Manipur. He plays for the India men's national kho kho team as a wazir and an attacker. He was part of the Indian men’s team that won the inaugural Kho Kho World Cup held at New Delhi in January 2025. He played for Telugu Yodhas in the first season of the Ultimate Kho Kho (UKK), a franchise based league tournament. In the second season, he played for Mumbai Khiladis.

== Early life ==
Singh is from Imphal, Manipur. His father is a farmer. He did his schooling at Nilapadma Higher Secondary School, Sekmai, Imphal. Later, he studied at Birmangol College, Sawombung village, Imphal. He started playing kho kho in 2010. He is also a football player and plays the Manipur State League for USA Khurai team.

== Career ==
In January 2025, Singh was part of the Indian team that won the inaugural Kho Kho World Cup at New Delhi. The Indian team were placed in Group A and defeated Nepal, Brazil, Peru and Bhutan in the group stages. In the quarterfinals, India defeated Sri Lanka and beat South Africa 62-42 in the semifinals. In the finals, India defeated Nepal 54-36 to lift their maiden World Cup.

He represented Manipur in the Junior National Kho Kho Championship and since then, he has been a regular member of the Manipur team.
