= Sachin Bhargo =

Indian kho kho player

Sachin Bhargo (born 15 May 2000) is an Indian kho kho player from Madhya Pradesh. He plays for the India men's national kho kho team as a Wazir. He was part of the Indian men’s team that won the inaugural Kho Kho World Cup held at New Delhi in January 2025. He plays for Telugu Yoddhas in the first season of Ultimate Kho Kho, a franchise based league tournament. Later, he also played for Chennai Quick Guns.

== Early life and career ==
Bhargo is from a farming family in Dewas, Madhya Pradesh. He started playing kho kho at nine. He began with a local club Narayan Krida Mandal, Madhya Bharat. He has been representing the Indian team since 2016, when the Indian team won the South Asian Games gold medal.

In January 2025, he was part of the Indian team that won the inaugural Kho Kho World Cup at New Delhi. The Indian team were placed in Group A and defeated Nepal, Brazil, Peru and Bhutan in the group stages. In the quarterfinals, India defeated Sri Lanka and beat South Africa 62-42 in the semifinals. In the finals, India defeated Nepal 54-36 to lift their maiden World Cup.

He also played the Ultimate Kho Kho representing Telugu Yoddhas in the first season. In the second year, he played for Chennai Quick Guns. He excelled as wazir and also received the ‘Best Attacker’ and ‘Best Sky Diver’ awards during.
