= Pothi Reddy Siva Reddy =

Indian kho kho player

Pothi Reddy Siva Reddy (born 1996) is an Indian kho kho player from Andhra Pradesh. He plays for the India men's national kho kho team as an all-rounder. He was part of the Indian men's team that won the inaugural Kho Kho World Cup held at New Delhi in January 2025. He plays for Mumbai Khiladis in the Ultimate Kho Kho, a franchise based league tournament. In the first season he was the vice captain of Gujarat Giants team.

== Early life and career ==
Reddy is from Edara village, Prakasam district, Andhra Pradesh. His parents are into farming and he has one brother, who works as a village surveyor. He works as a Postal Assistant at the Head Post Office, Adilabad, Telangana. He started playing kho kho in 2006.

== Career ==
In January 2025, he was part of the Indian team that won the inaugural Kho Kho World Cup at New Delhi. The Indian team were placed in Group A and defeated Nepal, Brazil, Peru and Bhutan in the group stages. In the quarterfinals, India defeated Sri Lanka and beat South Africa 62–42 in the semifinals. In the finals, India defeated Nepal 54–36 to lift their maiden World Cup. He also won two international gold medals and a 'Best Attacker' award from the International Kho Kho Federation in London.

He represented Andhra Pradesh in seven Senior National Kho Kho Championships and nine south zone tournaments. He also played the 35th National Games held at Kerala.
