= Subramani V. =

Indian kho kho player

Subramani V. (born 2002) is an Indian kho kho player from Tamil Nadu. He plays for the India men's national kho kho team as an all-rounder. He was part of the Indian men's team that won the inaugural Kho Kho World Cup held at New Delhi in January 2025. He plays for Gujarat Giants in the Ultimate Kho Kho, a franchise based league tournament. In the first season, he played for Telugu Yodhas.

== Early life and education ==
Subramani is from Tamil Nadu. He is the son of a lorry driver and his mother is a daily-wage labourer. He started playing at the age of 11 and he has a brother, also a kho kho player, who now works in an IT company. He is studying third year BA in Tamil.

== Career ==
In January 2025, Subramani was part of the Indian team that won the inaugural Kho Kho World Cup at New Delhi. The Indian team were placed in Group A and defeated Nepal, Brazil, Peru and Bhutan in the group stages. In the quarterfinals, India defeated Sri Lanka and beat South Africa 62-42 in the semifinals. In the finals, India defeated Nepal 54-36 to lift their maiden World Cup.
