= Nikhil B. =

Indian kho kho player

Krishnanduvil B. Nikhil (born 2001) is an Indian kho kho player from Kerala. He plays for the India men's national kho kho team as an all-rounder. He was part of the Indian men's team that won the inaugural Kho Kho World Cup held at New Delhi in January 2025. He played for Rajasthan Warriors in the first season and was picked up by Odisha Juggernauts for the second season in the Ultimate Kho Kho, a franchise based league tournament.

== Early life and career ==
Nikhil is from Kuriyathi village, Uzhamalakkal panchayat, Thiruvananthapuram district, Kerala. He is the son of A. Binu Kumar, a truck driver, and homemaker Bindu, a former kho kho player. She introduced Nikhil to kho kho, and he has a twin brother, Nidhim and another brother. He did his schooling at Sree Narayana Higher Secondary School. His first coach in the school was S. Sanjay Kumar. He completed his bachelor's degree in physical education. He played for SNSC Kerala team.

== Career ==
In January 2025, he was part of the Indian team that won the inaugural Kho Kho World Cup at New Delhi. The Indian team were placed in Group A and defeated Nepal, Brazil, Peru and Bhutan in the group stages. In the quarterfinals, India defeated Sri Lanka and beat South Africa 62–42 in the semifinals. In the finals, India defeated Nepal 54–36 to lift their maiden World Cup.

In domestic events, he represented Kerala in the Senior National Kho Kho Championship and won a bronze medal. He also participated in the Khelo India Youth Games and won a silver medal as part of the Kerala team.
