= Sumon Barman =

Indian kho kho player

Sumon Barman (born 2002) is an Indian kho kho player from West Bengal. He plays for the India men's national kho kho team as an allrounder. He was part of the Indian men's team that won the inaugural Kho Kho World Cup held at New Delhi in January 2025. He plays for Chennai Quick Guns in the Ultimate Kho Kho, a franchise based league tournament.

== Early life ==
Barman is from Milan Palli of Chunsurah, Hooghly district, West Bengal. He is the son of Ramdev Barman, a cook who works for daily wages and his mother, Sujata Barman, is a domestic help, who also does odd tailoring works at home. They live a one-room house of 10 ft x 10 ft with tin roof. He has a sister, Riya Barman, also a kho kho player, and a brother. Krishnaranjan Chakraborty was his first coach and he also trained under assistant coach Sujit Saha.

== Career ==
In January 2025, he was part of the Indian team that won the inaugural Kho Kho World Cup at New Delhi. The Indian team were placed in Group A and defeated Nepal, Brazil, Peru and Bhutan in the group stages. In the quarterfinals, India defeated Sri Lanka and beat South Africa 62–42 in the semifinals. In the finals, India defeated Nepal 54–36 to lift their maiden World Cup.
