= Suyash Gargate =

Indian kho kho player

Suyash Vishwas Gargate (born 8 June 1997) is an Indian kho kho player from Maharashtra. He plays for the India men's national kho kho team as an all-rounder. He was part of the Indian men’s team that won the inaugural Kho Kho World Cup held at New Delhi in January 2025. He plays for Gujarat Giants in the Ultimate Kho Kho (UKK), a franchise based league tournament. Giants won the UKK in their second season in 2024.

== Early life and education ==
Gargate is from Vijaynagar Colony, Pune, Maharashtra. He has an elder brother. He completed his BSc in computer science and later, did an MA in economics. He started playing kho kho in 2007. In September 2024, he was recruited by the Department of School Education and Sports, Government of Maharashtra, as a Sports Executive Officer (Training), a Group B gazetted post.

== Career ==
In January 2025, Gargate was part of the Indian team that won the inaugural Kho Kho World Cup at New Delhi. The Indian team were placed in Group A and defeated Nepal, Brazil, Peru and Bhutan in the group stages. In the quarterfinals, India defeated Sri Lanka and beat South Africa 62-42 in the semifinals. In the finals, India defeated Nepal 54-36 to lift their maiden World Cup.

He represented Maharashtra in various Senior National Kho Kho Championships and won a gold and a silver medal. In 2024, he was part of the Gujarat Giants team that won the second season of the Ultimate Kho Kho league and then played for Maharashtra team that won the 56th Senior National Kho Kho Championship. He played for India in the test series against Nepal and England. He also played for Airports Authority of India.
