= Gowtham M. K. =

Indian kho kho player

Gowtham M. K. (born 1997) is an Indian kho kho player from Karnataka. He plays for the India men's national kho kho team as a defender. He was part of the Indian men’s team that won the inaugural Kho Kho World Cup held at New Delhi in January 2025. He plays for Odisha Juggernauts in the Ultimate Kho Kho, a franchise based league tournament.

== Early life and education ==
Gowtham is from Maddur in Mandya district but resides at Chamarajpet, Bengaluru Urban district, Karnataka. His father drives an auto rickshaw in Chamarajpet. He did his schooling at Lakshmi Devi Ramanna School. He did his graduation at Government First Grade College, Vijayanagar, Bengaluru. He is employed with the Postal Department on sports quota and works at the HSR Layout Post Office in Bengaluru. In 2007, he started playing kho kho in Class 5 for recreation but soon took it up seriously playing for his school under coach Mahadesh. Later, he joined the Young Pioneers Sports Club in Vijayanagar area and trained under coach Kumar.

== Career ==
In January 2025, he was part of the Indian team that won the inaugural Kho Kho World Cup at New Delhi. The Indian team were placed in Group A and defeated Nepal, Brazil, Peru and Bhutan in the group stages. In the quarterfinals, India defeated Sri Lanka and beat South Africa 62-42 in the semifinals, where Gowtham played well. In the finals, India defeated Nepal 54-36 to lift their maiden World Cup.

In 2012, he was part of the Karnataka team that won the sub junior Nationals in Bengaluru, his first big tournament. Later, he represented Karnataka in all age groups and also captained the state team. He won about 15 medals playing for Karnataka. After he represented India in the 4th Asian Championships, he bagged employment in the postal department. He played the Senior National Kho Kho Championships in 2017 and was picked up for the Indian team.
