= Akash Kumar (kho kho) =

Indian kho kho player

Akash Kumar Baliyan (born 2002) is an Indian kho kho player from Uttar Pradesh. He plays for the India men's national kho kho team as an attacker. He was part of the Indian men’s team that won the inaugural Kho Kho World Cup held at New Delhi in January 2025. He plays for Telugu Yoddhas in the Ultimate Kho Kho, a franchise based league tournament.

== Early life and education ==
Kumar is from Basera village, Tappal block, Aligarh, Uttar Pradesh. He is the son of Roudas Singh and his elder brother Vikas Baliyan was a National level kho kho player. Encouraged by his brother, he started playing kho kho in Class 7. He studied his intermediate at Sarvopyogi Inter College, Palsera, Aligarh, where he started to take part in competitions. His coaches in the early years were Ajay Kumar Rai, Dalveer Singh Baliyan and Waliuzzama Khan.

== Career ==
In January 2025, he was part of the Indian team that won the inaugural Kho Kho World Cup at New Delhi. The Indian team were placed in Group A and defeated Nepal, Brazil, Peru and Bhutan in the group stages. In the quarterfinals, India defeated Sri Lanka and beat South Africa 62-42 in the semifinals. In the finals, India defeated Nepal 54-36 to lift their maiden World Cup. In 2023, he represented India in the Asian Games at Hangzhou, China. In 2024, he captained the Indian team in the India Nepal series.

=== Domestic career ===
He started playing kho kho in 2012 and took part in the under 17 Nationals in 2013 and 2014. Later, he played the under 19 Nationals in 2015 and 2016. He played his first Senior National Kho Kho Championship in 2019 at Delhi and has been taking part in the senior Nationals ever since. After returning from the World Cup, he was felicitated at Sarangpur village.
