= 2022 Ultimate Kho Kho final =

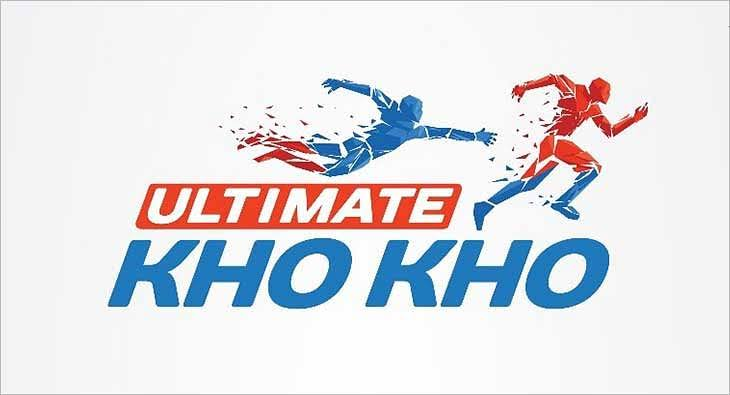

The 2022 Ultimate Kho Kho final was contested between the Odisha Juggernauts and the Telugu Yoddhas on 4 September 2022 at the Shree Shiv Chhatrapati Sports Complex in Pune. Odisha won the match 46–45.

== Road to the final ==
Odisha finished second in the league stage, and beat the Gujarat Giants in Qualifier 1 to reach the final.

The Yoddhas finished third in the league stage, and beat the Chennai Quick Guns in the Eliminator and then the Gujarat Giants in Qualifier 2 to reach the final.

== Match ==
Odisha won the coin toss and decided to defend first.

=== Turn 1 ===
Points scored per team: 10-10.

End-of-turn score: 10-10.

Odisha scored 10 Dream Run points in the first turn; it was the lowest-scoring turn on attack for the Yoddhas in the entire tournament, and resulted in the scores being tied at 10 points.

=== Turn 2 ===
Points scored per team: 13–10.

End-of-turn score: 23–20.

The Yoddhas scored 10 Dream Run points in their first defending turn as well, due in large part to a 8-point Dream Run (over 4 minutes of defense) by Adarsh Mohite, Rohan Shinghade & Arun Gunki, keeping the game relatively even at half-time.

=== Turn 3 ===
Points scored per team: 4-21.

End-of-turn score: 27–41.

=== Turn 4 ===
Points scored per team: 19–4.

Final score: 46–45.

With 1 minute and 24 seconds left in the match, the Juggernauts whittled down the Yoddhas' lead to 2 points by tagging Sachin Bhargav, who had scored 2 Dream Run points (with 2:44 of defense) prior to being dismissed.

With 14 seconds left, the Odisha attacker Suresh Lande was able to tag the Telugu defender Avdhut Patil with a Sky Dive, and thus scored 3 points to put Odisha permanently into the lead.

== Awards ==
Best Attacker: Arun Gunki

Best Defender: Dilip Khandvi

Ultimate Kho: Vishal
