= Aditya Ganpule =

Indian kho kho player

Aditya Prashant Ganpule (born 2004) is an Indian kho kho player from Maharashtra. He plays for the India men's national kho kho team as an allrounder. He was part of the Indian men’s team that won the inaugural Kho Kho World Cup held at New Delhi in January 2025. He plays for Telugu Yoddhas in the Ultimate Kho Kho, a franchise based league tournament.

== Early life ==
Ganpule's father used to sell newspapers. But he is now running a shop. He is working with Western Railways.

== Career ==
In January 2025, he was part of the Indian team that won the inaugural Kho Kho World Cup at New Delhi. The Indian team were placed in Group A and defeated Nepal, Brazil, Peru and Bhutan in the group stages. In the quarterfinals, India defeated Sri Lanka and beat South Africa 62-42 in the semifinals. In the finals, India defeated Nepal 54-36 to lift their maiden World Cup.
