= Pabani Sabar =

Indian kho kho player

Pabani Sabar (born 17 October 2004) is an Indian kho kho player from Odisha. He plays for the India men's national kho kho team as an allrounder. He was part of the Indian men’s team that won the inaugural Kho Kho World Cup held at New Delhi in January 2025. He plays for Gujarat Giants in the Ultimate Kho Kho, a franchise based league tournament.

== Early life and education ==
Sabar is from Gajapati district, Odisha. He is the son of late Papeya Sabar and Sambari Sabar. His father died in 2012. He has two brothers and a sister. He started playing kho kho in Class 8. He is doing his graduation in arts at Kalinga Institute of Social Sciences and is a trainee of the Odisha Kho Kho High Performance Centre at Bhubaneswar.

== Career ==
In January 2025, he was part of the Indian team that won the inaugural Kho Kho World Cup at New Delhi. The Indian team were placed in Group A and defeated Nepal, Brazil, Peru and Bhutan in the group stages. In the quarterfinals, India defeated Sri Lanka and beat South Africa 62-42 in the semifinals. In the finals, India defeated Nepal 54-36 to lift their maiden World Cup.

In June 2022, he participated in the 4th Khelo India Youth Games at Panchakula, Haryana where Odisha team won a silver medal. In February 2025, he participated in the 38th National Games at Haldwani, Uttarakhand and won a silver medal as part of Odisha men’s team.
