= Mehul Taak =

Indian kho kho player

Mehul Taak (born 27 August 2004) is an Indian kho kho player from New Delhi. He plays for the India men's national kho kho team as an allrounder. He was part of the Indian men's team that won the inaugural Kho Kho World Cup held at New Delhi in January 2025.

== Early life ==
Taak is from Palam, South West Delhi district. He did his schooling at GBSS School, Raj Nagar, Palam, Delhi and later went to a college affiliated with University of Delhi.

== Career ==
In January 2025, he was part of the Indian team that won the inaugural Kho Kho World Cup at New Delhi. The Indian team were placed in Group A and defeated Nepal, Brazil, Peru and Bhutan in the group stages. In the quarterfinals, India defeated Sri Lanka and beat South Africa 62–42 in the semifinals. In the finals, India defeated Nepal 54–36 to lift their maiden World Cup.
