= India men's national kho kho team =

Indian men's kho kho team

India
- Association: Kho Kho Federation of India
- Confederation: International Kho Kho Federation
- Head Coach: Ashwani Kumar Sharma
- Captain: Pratik Waikar

World Cup
- Appearances: 1 (first in 2025)
- Best result: (gold) 1st (2025)

Asian Kho Kho Championship
- Appearances: 4 (first in 1996)
- Best result: (gold) 1st (1996, 2000, 2016, 2023)
Medal record
Event	1st	2nd	3rd
Kho Kho World Cup	1	0	0
Asian Championship	4	0	0
Total	5	0	0
Kho Kho World Cup
Gold medal – first place	2025 New Delhi	
Asian Championship
Gold medal – first place	1996 Kolkata	
Gold medal – first place	2000 Dhaka	
Gold medal – first place	2016 Indore	
Gold medal – first place	2023 Assam	

The India men's national kho kho team represents India in international men's Kho Kho competitions. Governed by the Kho Kho Federation of India (KKFI), it is a member of the International Kho Kho Federation (IKKF). India hosted the first Kho Kho World Cup and won the inaugural men's title, remaining unbeaten through seven matches and beating Nepal 54–36 in the final in New Delhi. The team has also won the men's title at every Asian Kho Kho Championship held to date: in 1996, 2000, 2016 and 2023.

== History ==
=== Origins and early development ===
Kho kho is a traditional tag sport from the Indian subcontinent. The Kho Kho Federation of India was set up in 1955 and held the first National Championship in Vijayawada, Andhra Pradesh, in 1959. Kho kho was a demonstration sport at the 1936 Berlin Olympics and at the 3rd South Asian Federation Games in Kolkata in 1987, where the Asian Kho Kho Federation was formed.

=== Asian Championship (1996–2023) ===
The first Asian Kho Kho Championship was held in Kolkata in 1996 with five teams, and India defeated Bangladesh in the final. The second edition was held in Dhaka, Bangladesh, in 2000, with India listed as champion. India's men and women both won the third edition in Indore in 2016, with Bangladesh as men's runner-up and Nepal third.

In the fourth edition, hosted by the Kho Kho Federation of India in Assam from 20 to 24 March 2023 with ten countries taking part, India's men won the title again, with Nepal as runner-up and Bangladesh third; the Indian women also won.

=== 2025 Kho Kho World Cup ===
The inaugural Kho Kho World Cup was held at the Indira Gandhi Indoor Stadium in New Delhi from 13 to 19 January 2025, with 20 men's and 19 women's teams. The KKFI named a 15-member squad captained by Pratik Waikar after a national camp in New Delhi from 10 December 2024 to 10 January 2025.

Placed in Group A, India beat Nepal 42–37 in the opening match of the tournament, then Brazil (64–34), Peru (70–38) and Bhutan (71–34). In the knockouts India beat Sri Lanka 100–40 in the quarter-final and South Africa 62–42 in the semi-final, before defeating Nepal 54–36 in the final; Waikar and Ramji Kashyap led the side in the final.

=== Since the World Cup ===
The Odisha state government began sponsoring the national kho kho teams in January 2025 for three years. Commonwealth Sport approved India to host the first Commonwealth Kho Kho Championship from 9 to 14 March 2026, with 16 men's and 16 women's teams expected. The next World Cup is scheduled for 2027 in Birmingham, England.

== Governing body ==
The Kho Kho Federation of India (KKFI) is the national governing body for kho kho and organises the Senior National Kho Kho Championship from which national squads are selected. The 58th edition began in Kazipet, Telangana, in January 2026 with more than 1,400 athletes from 79 teams. The KKFI is led by president Sudhanshu Mittal.

== Tournament history ==
=== Kho Kho World Cup ===
India has won the only men's World Cup held to date.

Kho Kho World Cup
Year	Host city	Position
2025	New Delhi, India	(gold) 1st
2027	Birmingham, England	To be determined

Kho Kho World Cup record
Year	Result	Position	Pld	W	D*	L
(India) 2025	Champion	1st place, gold medalist(s)	7	7	0	0
Total	1/1	1 Title	7	7	0	0

=== Asian Kho Kho Championship ===
India has won all four editions of the men's tournament.

Asian Kho Kho Championship
Year	Host	Position	Runner-up
1996	Kolkata, India	(gold) 1st	Bangladesh
2000	Dhaka, Bangladesh	(gold) 1st	Bangladesh
2016	Indore, India	(gold) 1st	Bangladesh
2023	Assam, India	(gold) 1st	Nepal

== Recent results and fixtures ==
=== 2025 match results ===
Competition	Date	Round	Opponent	Score	Venue
World Cup	13 January 2025	Group A	Nepal	42–37	Indira Gandhi Indoor Stadium, New Delhi
World Cup	14 January 2025	Group A	Brazil	64–34	Indira Gandhi Indoor Stadium, New Delhi
World Cup	15 January 2025	Group A	Peru	70–38	Indira Gandhi Indoor Stadium, New Delhi
World Cup	16 January 2025	Group A	Bhutan	71–34	Indira Gandhi Indoor Stadium, New Delhi
World Cup	17 January 2025	Quarter-final	Sri Lanka	100–40	Indira Gandhi Indoor Stadium, New Delhi
World Cup	18 January 2025	Semi-final	South Africa	62–42	Indira Gandhi Indoor Stadium, New Delhi
World Cup	19 January 2025	Final	Nepal	54–36	Indira Gandhi Indoor Stadium, New Delhi

== 2025 World Cup squad ==
The following 15 players represented India at the first Kho Kho World Cup in January 2025.

No.	Name	Date of birth	Position	State
1	Pratik Kiran Waikar (c)	27 March 1992	Wazir	Maharashtra
6	Ramji Harishchandra Kashyap	2 March 2003	All rounder	Maharashtra
3	Sachin Bhargo	15 May 2000	Wazir	Madhya Pradesh
8	Suyash Vishwas Gargate	8 June 1997	All rounder	Maharashtra
12	Sinam Rokeson Singh		Attacker	Manipur
5	Gowtham M. K.	1997	Defender	Karnataka
53	Nikhil B.	2001	All rounder	Kerala
67	Pabani Sabar	17 October 2004	All rounder	Odisha
19	Aditya Prashant Ganpule	2004	All rounder	
4	Akash Kumar	2002	Attacker	Uttar Pradesh
10	Pothi Reddy Siva Reddy	1996	All rounder	Andhra Pradesh
23	Subramani V.	2002	All rounder	Tamil Nadu
1	Aniket Bhagwan Pote	7 November 1996	All rounder	Maharashtra
9	Sumon Barman	29 December 2004	All rounder	West Bengal
55	Mehul Taak	2002	All rounder	New Delhi

Standby players: Akshay Bangare, Rajvardhan Shankar Patil and Vishwanath Janakiram.

== Coaching staff ==
Position	Name
Chief coach	(India) Ashwani Kumar Sharma

== Training facilities ==
Ahead of the 2025 World Cup the squad trained at a month-long camp at the Sports Authority of India JLN Stadium in New Delhi.

== Sponsorship ==
The Indian national kho kho teams are sponsored by the Odisha state government for three years from January 2025 to December 2027, with Rs 5 crore committed per year (Rs 15 crore in total).

== Honours ==
=== World ===
- Kho Kho World Cup:
  - Champions (1): 2025

=== Asia ===
- Asian Kho Kho Championship:
  - Champions (4): 1996, 2000, 2016, 2023

== Players ==
=== Captains ===
Pratik Waikar captained India at the 2025 World Cup.

=== Recent stars ===
- Pratik Waikar – A wazir from Maharashtra and captain of the World Cup-winning team.
- Ramji Kashyap – An all-rounder from Maharashtra and a standout of the tournament.
- Aditya Ganpule – Player of the match in India's opening win over Nepal.

== See also ==
- India women's national kho kho team
- Kho Kho World Cup
- Asian Kho Kho Championship
- Kho Kho Federation of India
- Ultimate Kho Kho
- India men's national kabaddi team
