= Waikar =

Waikar is a surname. Notable people with the surname include:

- Pratik Waikar (born 1992), Indian kho kho player
- Ravindra Waikar, Indian politician
- Yamunabai Waikar (1915–2018), Indian folk artist
