= Half-time =

Time when half of the regular playing time has expired

In several team sports, matches are played in two halves. Half-time (also written halftime or half time) is the name given to the interval between the two halves of the match. Typically, after half-time, teams swap ends of the field of play in order to reduce any advantage that may be gained from wind or a slope to the playing surface, for example.

While it exists mainly to allow competitors to rest briefly and recover from the play of the first half, half-time also serves a number of other purposes. It also serves as an intermission for spectators, and, especially in North America, often features entertainment, such as cheerleading performances, tifos, performances by school marching bands (particularly in high school and collegiate sports in North America), or concerts featuring popular music acts (particularly in major events such as the Super Bowl). On games that are broadcast on television and radio, it also provides broadcasters with an opportunity to give a recap of the first half of the game, air highlights of other games in progress, air commercials and other advertisements, provide analysis on the game, or air game-related festivities (such as an aforementioned half-time performance).

== History ==
The main origin of changing ends at half-time lies in the early English public school football games. One early use of a fixed half-time (as suggested by Adrian Harvey in his book, Football, The First Hundred Years: The Untold Story) is that the origin of the practice was to allow for two football teams each used to a different set of rules to play half of the game by familiar rules, and half by the opposition rules. This was practised notably between followers of Eton-rules football (closer to modern association football) and Rugby-rules football (closer to modern rugby Rugby union). This particular use of half-time could be seen as unnecessary after the standardisation of football rules (and indeed, the first set of FA Laws in 1863 did not provide for a half time interval) but is still used for the now-rare contests between teams playing different codes of football. Provision for a half time interval in FA Laws was introduced in 1870 and has been part of those Laws (and later, IFAB Laws) ever since (see Laws of the Game). Changing ends at half-time (if no goals had been scored) was part of the following schools' codes: Brighton, Eton, Rossall, Sheffield, and Winchester. Other schools changed every time that side scored (Cheltenham, FA, Harrow, Marlborough, Rugby, Shrewsbury, Uppingham schools) The 1863 Cambridge Rules state: "In a match when half the time agreed upon has elapsed, the side shall change goals when the ball is next out of play".

== Overview ==
One benefit of half-time in a field game is to allow teams to swap their positions on the field in order that the effects of the natural conditions such as sunlight and wind direction are experienced fairly by both teams. In some sports this is achieved without the need for half-time: for example, in cricket fielding positions of players are rotated after a set passage of play. In other sports no such provision is necessary, for example in baseball, where playing positions do not change and both teams occupy the same locations on the field of play, though there is frequent rotation of players in the ordinary course of play.

Half-time for spectators offers the opportunity to visit the toilet, get some food or drink, or just exercise cramped limbs, without the fear of missing any of the action. A half-time show may be put on for the spectators to keep their attention, most famously in the case of the American football Super Bowl. As many spectators at the ground may be otherwise occupied using stadium facilities it might be inferred that the scale and spectacle of half-time entertainment is more directly related to the size of the potential television audience.

In many sports that are televised, half-time offers the opportunity to advertise, a valuable source of revenue for television companies. In addition, it allows analysis of the game so far by pundits; controversial incidents or exceptional play may be highlighted at this time. It also allows viewers to catch up with any action that they may have missed. Half-time has spawned one of the most enduring clichés to describe football: that "it's a game of two halves."

== List of team sports ==
=== With half-time ===
| Sport | Length of half-time | Length of a half |
|---|---|---|
| American football | 13 (professional) or 20 (college) minutes | Two 15 minute quarters. In IFAF, two 15-minute quarters. |
| Association football | 15 minutes | 45 minutes plus stoppage time |
| Australian rules football | 20 minutes | Two periods (quarters) of 20 minutes plus stoppage time (AFL) and 15 minutes plus stoppage time (AFL Women's). |
| Bandy | ≤20 minutes | 45 minutes plus injury time, replacement time etc. |
| Basketball | 15 minutes | Two periods (quarters) of 10 (FIBA, WNBA, WNBL, NBL, NCAAW) or 12 (NBA) minutes each or one period (half) of 20 minutes (NCAAM). |
| Canoe Polo | 1–3 minutes | 7–10 minutes |
| Canadian football | 15 minutes | Two 15 minute quarters (CFL, Canadian university football). |
| Limited overs cricket | 10 minutes | About 3.5 hours in ODI cricket, and 90 minutes in T20 cricket (though times can significantly vary, as weather can interrupt a game, teams may play slowly in violation of regulations, or a half can end early because a team is all out.) |
| Field hockey | 15 minutes | Two 15-minute periods |
| Gaelic football | 12 minutes | 30 or 35 minutes |
| Handball | 15 minutes | 30 minutes |
| Hurling | 12 minutes | 30 or 35 minutes |
| Kabaddi | 5 minutes | 20 minutes |
| Kho-kho | 6 minutes (3 minutes in UKK) | Two turns (quarters) of 9 minutes each (7 minutes each in Ultimate Kho Kho) |
| Korfball (Korfbal League) | 10 minutes | 25 minutes (real playing time) |
| Lacrosse | 12 minutes in NLL only | Two periods (quarters) of 15 minutes each in NLL |
| Netball | 5 minutes | Two periods (quarters) of 15 minutes each |
| Rugby league | 10 minutes | 40 minutes |
| Rugby union | 10-15 minutes | 40 minutes |
| Rugby sevens (union) | 1 minute | 7 minutes |
| Shinty | 10 minutes | 45 minutes |
| Underwater hockey | 3 minutes | 15 minutes |

=== With intervals other than half-time ===
- Ice hockey is played in three periods of twenty minutes with eighteen-minute intermissions between regulation periods.
- Water polo
- Test cricket
- Box lacrosse
- Volleyball matches typically take three minutes between sets 1 and 2 and any sets after the 3rd (if played). The interval between sets 2 and 3 is sometimes longer and sometimes the same.

=== No half-time or equivalent ===
(other than to allow movement of players in the natural course of play and/or TV commercials)

- Baseball (although there is a seventh-inning stretch)
- Softball
