= 2023–24 Ultimate Kho Kho final =

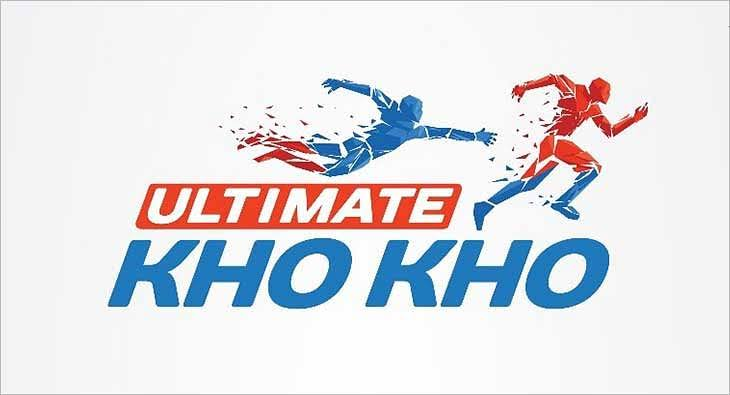

The 2023-24 Ultimate Kho Kho final was contested on 13 January 2024 at the Jawaharlal Nehru Indoor Stadium, Cuttack. Gujarat Giants beat Chennai Quick Guns 31–26.

== Road to the final ==
Gujarat Giants beat Odisha Juggernauts 29–27 in Semifinal 1 to reach the final.

Chennai Quick Guns registered a 31–29 victory in Semifinal 2 against the Telugu Yoddhas to reach the final.

== Match ==
Chennai won the coin toss and decided to defend.

=== Turn 1 ===
Points scored by each team: 14-1

End-of-turn score: 14-1

Chennai defender Sumon Barman scored 1 Dream Run point.

=== Turn 2 ===
Points scored by each team: 5-6

End-of-turn score: 19-7

The first Gujarat Giants defensive batch of Suyash Gargate, Shubham Thorat and Deepak Madhav scored 5 Dream Run points, (5:06 of defense), with Gargate managing an active time of 2:12 and Madhav for 1:20. (Note: "Active time" refers to the amount of time a defender avoids being dismissed after the most recent dismissal of one of their teammates.) All three members of the next batch remained undismissed.

=== Turn 3 ===
Points scored by each team: 10-3

End-of-turn score: 29-10

Gujarat attacker Sanket Kadam tagged 3 defenders, with the Giants dismissing a total of 5 Chennai defenders. Chennai defender Ramji Kashyap scored 2 of the 3 Dream Run points for Chennai in this turn.

=== Turn 4 ===
Points scored by each team: 2-16

Final score: 31–26

The Quick Guns scored points rapidly in the first half of the turn, and whittled down the Giants' lead to 3 points with 1:47 minutes left in the match; however, Gujarat defender Sanket Kadam scored 2 Dream Run points (over 3:30 of defense) at the end of the turn to seal victory for his team.

== Awards ==
Best Attacker: Sanket Kadam

Best Defender: Vijay Shinde

Ultimate Kho: Suyash Gargate
