= Ramji Kashyap =

Indian kho kho player

Ramji Harishchandra Kashyap (born 2 March 2003) is an Indian kho kho player from Maharashtra. He plays for the India men's national kho kho team as an all-rounder. He was part of the Indian men's team that won the inaugural Kho Kho World Cup held at New Delhi in January 2025. He plays for Chennai Quick Guns in the Ultimate Kho Kho, a franchise based league tournament.

== Early life ==
Kashyap is from Velapur village, Solapur district, Maharashtra. His parents come from a poor background and are migrant labourers who collect scrap for a living. In 1990s, they migrated from Kanpur in Uttar Pradesh to eastern Maharashtra and settled in Velapur. He has two brothers and a sister, who all help his parents in carrying the scrap. Kashyap took to kho kho after joining the local Municipal School which offered English medium education. His parents initially were reluctant to let him go for training as it means one pair of hands less for the hard work. But after playing Ultimate Kho Kho, he earned Rs.5 lakhs. Now he works with Central Railway in Mumbai. One of his early coaches, was Somanath Bansode.

== Career ==
In January 2025, Kashyap was part of the Indian team that won the inaugural Kho Kho World Cup at New Delhi. The Indian team were placed in Group A and defeated Nepal, Brazil, Peru and Bhutan in the group stages. In the quarterfinals, India defeated Sri Lanka and beat South Africa 62-42 in the semifinals. In the finals, India defeated Nepal 54-36 to lift their maiden World Cup.
