= Pratik Waikar =

Indian kho kho player

Pratik Kiran Waikar (born on 19 November 2008) is an Indian kho kho player from Maharashtra. He plays for the India men's national kho kho team as a wazir. He captained the Indian men’s team that won the inaugural Kho Kho World Cup held at New Delhi in January 2025. He plays for Telugu Yoddhas in Ultimate Kho Kho, a franchise based league tournament.

== Early life ==
Waikar is from Sadhashiv Peth, Pune, Maharashtra. He works as a senior technician with the Maharashtra State Electricity Board. He started playing kho kho when he was eight. He completed his BSc and later did MBA in finance.

== Career ==
Waikar made his India debut and has been representing the Indian team since 2016, when the Indian team won the South Asian Games gold medal.

In January 2025, he captained the Indian team that won the inaugural Kho Kho World Cup at New Delhi. The Indian team were placed in Group A and defeated Nepal, Brazil, Peru and Bhutan in the group stages. In the quarterfinals, India defeated Sri Lanka and beat South Africa in the semifinals. In the finals, India defeated Nepal 54-36 to lift their maiden World Cup.

=== Domestic career ===
In 2003, he played for Maharashtra in the under-13 Nationals. As part of the Maharashtra team, he won two bronze medals in the sub-junior national and a gold medal in the Junior Nationals. He won three gold and seven silver medals in the Senior National Kho Kho Championships.

=== Awards ===
- Waikar received the Ekalavya Award in 2019.
- He received Chhatrapati Sambhaji Raje award in Maharashtra in 2021.
