= 2022 Ultimate Kho Kho =

2022 Ultimate Kho Kho season
- League: Ultimate Kho Kho
- Sport: Kho Kho
- Hosts: Shree Shiv Chhatrapati Sports Complex, Pune
- Duration: 14 August – 4 September 2022
- Matches: 34
- Teams: 6
- Champions: Odisha Juggernauts (1st title)
- Runner-ups: Telugu Yoddhas

Seasons
- 2023–24 →

The 2022 season of Ultimate Kho Kho was the inaugural season hosted from 14 August to 4 September 2022. Six teams played a total of 34 matches. Odisha Juggernauts beat Telugu Yoddhas 46-45 in the final. The season had a viewership of 64 million, 41 million of which came from India. This made the league the third-most viewed non-cricket competition in India after the Pro Kabaddi and Indian Super League.

== History ==
An exhibition match was played on July 14, 2022. The player draft for the league was completed later that day, with 143 players chosen. Special effort had to be made to find a suitable indoor arena for the first season of Ultimate Kho Kho, given the requirement to have firmly fastened poles as part of the playing area.

=== Format ===
In this season, the rules around scoring worked like this: 2 points are scored for a regular tag (known as a "Running Touch"), and 3 points are scored if a tag is made while an attacker is either fully outstretched and diving ("Sky Dive") or touching a pole ("Pole Dive"), or if a defender got themselves out by stepping out of the field ("Boundary Out") or intentionally allowing themselves to be tagged ("Self-Out"). These rules were changed in the next season so that each tagged defender is always worth 2 points to the attacking team. The rule around Dream Runs was also different in this season: if any batch of defenders could avoid being all dismissed for at least 2 and a half minutes, they would earn 2 points, with an additional 2 points earned for every 30 seconds survived afterwards. In addition, there was a rule that if the attacking team dismissed 4 batches of defenders in a single turn (known as an "all out", since all 12 defenders on the opposing team will have been dismissed), 3 bonus points are scored.

=== Prize money ===
The winning team received ₹1 crore (equivalent to ₹1.1 crore or US$130,000 in 2023), while the runner-ups received ₹50 lakh (equivalent to ₹53 lakh or US$63,000 in 2023) and the third-placed team received ₹30 lakh (equivalent to ₹32 lakh or US$38,000 in 2023).

== Teams ==
Locations of the UKK teams

The six teams were, Chennai Quick Guns, Gujarat Giants, Mumbai Khiladis, Odisha Juggernauts, Rajasthan Warriors, and Telugu Yoddhas.

== Squads ==
=== Chennai Quick Guns ===
Attackers: Balvir Singh, Jaswant Singh, Manoj Patil, P Narasayya, Sachin Gaur, V Kabilan, and Venu Gopal S.

Defenders: Buchannagari Raju, Daasari Jeevith Rao, Vignesh M, Mahesh Madhukar Shinde(VC), N Suresh, P Anand Kumar, Prasad Vijay Patil, Pritam Ankush Chougule, S. Santhru, Sibin. M, and Vijay Vegad Jagdishbhai.

All-rounders: M Vignesh, Amit Vasant Patil(C), Madan, P Jai Prasath, Rajvardhan Shankar Patil, K Ram, Ramji Kashyap.

=== Gujarat Giants ===
Attackers: Abhinandan Mahadev Patil, Ranjan Sridhar Shetty(C), Chinmoy Nandi, Nilesh Sarjerao Patil, Praful Raju Bhange, S Kavin Raj, Sagar Subhash Lengare, S Sarathkumar, and Shubham Motiramji Jambhale.

Defenders: Mareppa, Ajay Kumar Mandra, Akshay Sandeep Bhangare, Aniket Bhagawan Pote, Dhiraj Vinod Bhave, Manoj Sarkar, Sagar Deepakraj, Saleem Khan, and Vinayak Sadashiv Pokarde.

All-rounders: Pothireddy Sivareddy(VC), Debendra Nath, Suyash Vishwas, T Jagannath, Rutishbhai Jayantibhai.

=== Mumbai Khiladis ===
Attackers: Kurpe Milind Rajendra, Shreejesh S, Abhishek Pathrode, Durvesh Vikas Salunke, Rajesh Kumar, Avik Singha, Bichu S S, Rahul Bharat Sawant, Devendra Dagur, and Ummer Ahmad Rathar.

Defenders: Rohan Bapuso Kore, Vijay Gajanan Hajare(C), Faizankha Sherkha Pathan, Gajanan Maruti Shengal, Rohit Verma, Sourabh Nathaji Ahir, Sribin Kp, Gaurav Kandpal, Abishek M S, Rajat Malik, Harish Mohmmad, Gaurav, and Srijin J.

All-rounders: Visag S

=== Odisha Juggernauts ===
Attackers: Suraj Shital Lande, Mahesha P, Avinash Shivaji Desai, Lipun Mukhi, Dinesh Naik S, Shiv Kumar Sen, Manoj Narayan Ghotekar, Darshanapu Sathish, Mukesh Prajapat

Defenders: Gowtham MK, Vishal, Suresh Kumar, Thugana Vinod Kumar, Gurjinder Singh, and Swayam Satyaprakash Parija.

All-rounders: Dilip Khandavi, Jagannatha Murmu, Aditya Sunil Kudale, Nilesh Ananda Jadhav, Dipesh Vijay More(Co-Captain), Subhasis Santra, Arjun Singh, and Milind Dilip Chavarekar(Co-captain)

=== Rajasthan Warriors ===
Attackers: Sourabh Shivaji Adavkar, Suresh Shamrao Sawant, Majahar Kalandar Jamadar(Co-Captain), Mohammed Taseen, Konjengbam Dhananjoy Singh, Sushant Sanjay Kaldhone, Atla Siva Nagi Reddy, Biswajit Das, Ashwani Ranjan, and Mukesh Maurya.

Defenders: Dilrajsing Rekha Sengar, Akshay Prashant Ganpule(Co-Captain), SK. Murtaja Ali, Jithin B, Tapan Pal, Mahesh M, and Bhuneshwar Sahu.

All-rounders: Abhijit Patil, Sushant Dattatray, Hrushikesh Vijay Murchavade, Shailesh Mahadev Sankapal, Govind Yadav, Bharat Kumar Pradhan, Nikhil B, Yalla Satish.

=== Telugu Yoddhas ===
Attackers: Prajwal KH(C), Adarsh Dattatray Mohite, Subramani V, Gavara Venkatesh, Thokchom Sadananda Meitei, P Hemachandran, Sachin Bhargo, Dhanush K C, Aditya Das, and Sinam Rokeson Singh.

Defenders: Sudershan, Deepak Vitthal Madhav, Avdhut Bharat Patil, Prasad Vaibhav Radye, Dhruv, and Bojjam Ranjith.

All-rounders: Pratik Waikar(VC), Rohan Shingade, Arun SA, Arun Ashok Gunki, Anukul Sarkar, and Pittu Bala Sambi Reddy

== Points table ==
Pos	Teams	Played	Won	Lost	Tied	No Result	Score Difference	Points	
1	Gujarat Giants	10	7	3	0	0	-8	23	Qualified To Qualifier1
2	Odisha Juggernauts	10	7	3	0	0	-4	21	Qualified To Qualifier1
3	Telugu Yoddhas	10	6	4	0	0	150	19	Qualified To Eliminator
4	Chennai Quick Guns	10	5	5	0	0	-3	15	Qualified To Eliminator
5	Mumbai Khiladis	10	4	6	0	0	-36	12	Eliminated
6	Rajasthan Warriors	10	1	9	0	0	-99	4	Eliminated

Top 4 teams qualify for playoffs

- 3 points awarded for a win
- 2 points for a tie
- 1 point for a loss by less than 4 points

== League stage ==
All Matches were played at Shree Shiv Chhatrapati Sports Complex
14 August 2022
Match 1:

20:00 (IST)

Mumbai Khiladis 44 vs 69 Gujarat Giants

Gujarat Giants beat Mumbai Khiladis by 25 points Report

Match 2:

21:15 (IST)

Chennai Quick Guns 40 vs 48 Telugu Yoddhas

Telugu Yoddhas beat Chennai Quick Guns by 10 points Report

15 August 2022

Match 3:

19:30 (IST)

Rajasthan Warriors 43 vs 51 Mumbai Khiladis

Mumbai Khiladis beat Rajasthan Warriors by 8 points Report

Match 4:

20:45(IST)

Odisha Juggernauts 51 vs 43 Chennai Quick Guns

Odisha Juggernauts beat Chennai Quick Guns by 8 points Report

16 August 2022

Match 5:

19:30 (IST)

Telugu Yoddhas 68 vs 47 Rajasthan Warriors

Telugu Yoddhas beat Rajasthan Warriors by 21 points Report

Match 6:

20:45(IST)

Gujarat Giants 54 vs 49 Odisha Juggernauts

Gujarat Giants beat Odisha Juggernauts by 5 points Report

17 August 2022

Match 7:

19:30 (IST)

Gujarat Giants 66 vs 48 Mumbai Khiladis

Gujarat Giants beat Mumbai Khiladis by 22 points Report

Match 8:

20:45(IST)

Telugu Yoddhas 25 vs 49 Chennai Quick Guns

Chennai Quick Guns beat Telugu Yoddhas by 25 points Report

19 August 2022

Match 9:

19:30 (IST)

Rajasthan Warriors 46 vs 65 Odisha Juggernauts

Odisha Juggernauts beat Rajasthan Warriors by 19 points Report

Match 10:

20:45(IST)

Mumbai Khiladis 45 vs 65 Chennai Quick Guns

Chennai Quick Guns beat Mumbai Khiladis by 20 points Report

21 August 2022

Match 11:

19:30 (IST)

Odisha Juggernauts 50 vs 47 Gujarat Giants

Odisha Juggernauts beat Gujarat Giants by 3 points Report

Match 12:

20:45(IST)

Rajasthan Warriors 45 vs 83 Telugu Yoddhas

Telugu Yoddhas beat Rajasthan Warriors by 38 points Report

23 August 2022

Match 13:

19:30 (IST)

Telugu Yoddhas 55 vs 43 Mumbai Khiladis

Telugu Yoddhas beat Mumbai Khiladis by 12 points Report

Match 14:

20:45(IST)

Gujarat Giants 51 vs 53 Chennai Quick Guns

Chennai Quick Guns beat Gujarat Giants by 2 points Report

24 August 2022

Match 15:

19:30 (IST)

Odisha Juggernauts 51 vs 41 Chennai Quick Guns

Odisha Juggernauts beat Chennai Quick Guns by 10 points Report

Match 16:

20:45(IST)

Mumbai Khiladis 56 vs 42 Rajasthan Warriors

Mumbai Khiladis beat Rajasthan Warriors by 14 points Report

25 August 2022

Match 17:

19:30 (IST)

Odisha Juggernauts 51 vs 45 Rajasthan Warriors

Odisha Juggernauts beat Rajasthan Warriors by 6 points Report

Match 18:

20:45(IST)

Gujarat Giants 51 vs 48 Telugu Yoddhas

Gujarat Giants beat Telugu Yoddhas by 3 points Report

26 August 2022

Match 19:

19:30 (IST)

Chennai Quick Guns 44 vs 50 Gujarat Giants

Gujarat Giants beat Chennai Quick Guns by 6 points Report

Match 20:

20:45(IST)

Mumbai Khiladis 54 vs 46 Telugu Yoddhas

Mumbai Khiladis beat Telugu Yoddhas by 8 points Report

27 August 2022

Match 21:

19:30 (IST)

Rajasthan Warriors 36 vs 57 Chennai Quick Guns

Chennai Quick Guns beat Rajasthan Warriors by 21 points Report

Match 22:

20:45(IST)

Odisha Juggernauts 60 vs 37 Mumbai Khiladis

Odisha Juggernauts beat Mumbai Khiladis by 23 points Report

28 August 2022

Match 23:

19:30 (IST)

Odisha Juggernauts 48 vs 39 Telugu Yoddhas

Odisha Juggernauts beat Telugu Yoddhas by 9 points Report

Match 24:

20:45(IST)

Rajasthan Warriors 40 vs 42 Gujarat Giants

Gujarat Giants beat Rajasthan Warriors by 2 points Report

29 August 2022

Match 25:

19:30 (IST)

Chennai Quick Guns 58 vs 42 Mumbai Khiladis

Chennai Quick Guns beat Mumbai Khiladis by 16 points Report

Match 26:

20:45(IST)

Telugu Yoddhas 88 vs 21 Gujarat Giants

Telugu Yoddhas beat Gujarat Giants by 67 points Report

30 August 2022

Match 27:

19:30 (IST)

Mumbai Khiladis 79 vs 31 Odisha Juggernauts

Mumbai Khiladis beat Odisha Juggernauts by 48 points Report

Match 28:

20:45(IST)

Chennai Quick Guns 31 vs 66 Rajasthan Warriors

Rajasthan Warriors beat Chennai Quick Guns by 35 points Report

31 August 2022

Match 29:

19:30 (IST)

Gujarat Giants 47 vs 42 Rajasthan Warriors

Gujarat Giants beat Rajasthan Warriors by 5 points Report

Match 30:

20:45(IST)

Telugu Yoddhas 65 vs 36 Odisha Juggernauts

Telugu Yoddhas beat Odisha Juggernauts by 29 points Report

== Playoffs ==
Semifinals
Qualifier 1
1	Gujarat Giants	43
2	Odisha Juggernauts	57
Eliminator
3	Telugu Yoddhas	61
4	Chennai Quick Guns	43

Preliminary final
Qualifier 2
1	Gujarat Giants	44
3	Telugu Yoddhas	67

Final
2	Odisha Juggernauts	46
3	Telugu Yoddhas	45

2 September 2022

Eliminator:

19:30 (IST)

Telugu Yoddhas 61 vs 43 Chennai Quick Guns

Telugu Yoddhas beat Chennai Quick Guns by 18 points Report

Qualifier 1:

20:45(IST)

Gujarat Giants 43 vs 57 Odisha Juggernauts

Odisha Juggernauts beat Gujarat Giants by 14 points Report

3 September 2022

Qualifier 2:

19:45(IST)

Gujarat Giants 44 vs 67 Telugu Yoddhas

Telugu Yoddhas beat Gujarat Giants by 23 points Report

4 September 2022

Final:

20:00(IST)

Odisha Juggernauts 46 vs 45 Telugu Yoddhas

Odisha Juggernauts beat Telugu Yoddhas by 1 point Report

== Awards ==
Award	Winners
Player of the Tournament	Ramji Kashyap (Chennai Quick Guns)
Young Player of the Tournament	Madan (Chennai Quick Guns)
Attacker of the Tournament	Abhinandan Patil (Gujarat Giants)
Defender of the Tournament	Deepak Madhav (Telugu Yoddhas)

== Stats ==
=== Player Stats ===
==== Top Attacker ====
Player	Team	Total Points
Ramji Kashyap	Chennai Quick Guns	108
Majahar Jamadar	Rajasthan Warriors	105
Arun Gunki	Telugu Yoddhas	96

==== Top Defenders ====
Player	Team	Defending Time
Ramji Kashyap	Chennai Quick Guns	21:48
Deepak Madhav	Telugu Yoddhas	20:23
Pratik Waikar	Telugu Yoddhas	20:13

==== Top Wazirs ====
Player	Team	Points
Abhinandan Patil	Gujarat Giants	89
Durvesh Salunke	Mumbai Khiladis	74
Hrushikesh Murchavade	Rajasthan Warriors	73

==== Total Sky Dives ====
Player	Team	Count
Ramji Kashyap	Chennai Quick Guns	24
Suraj Lande	Odisha Juggernauts	20
Rohan Shingade	Telugu Yoddhas	19

==== Total Pole Dives ====
Player	Team	Count
Arun Gunki	Telugu Yoddhas	13
Nilesh Jadhav	Odisha Juggernauts	11
Ranjan Shetty	Gujarat Giants	8

Total High 5s

Player	Team	Count
Majahar Jamadar	Rajasthan Warriors	1
Arun Gunki	Telugu Yoddhas	1
Nilesh Patil	Gujarat Giants	1

==== Not Outs ====
Player	Team	Count
Majahar Jamadar	Rajasthan Warriors	8
Adarsh Mohite	Telugu Yoddhas	8
Abhinandan Patil	Gujarat Giants	8

==== Total Touch Points ====
Player	Team	Points
Sreejesh S	Mumbai Khiladis	66
Abhinandan Patil	Gujarat Giants	66
Suyash Gargate	Gujarat Giants	50

==== Total Dive Points ====
Player	Team	Points
Ramji Kashyap	Chennai Quick Guns	88
Majahar Jamadar	Rajasthan Warriors	79
Rohan Shingade	Telugu Yoddhas	71

=== Team Stats ===
==== Team Total Points ====
Team	Points
Telugu Yoddhas	759
Odisha Juggernauts	595
Gujarat Giants	585
Chennai Quick Guns	526
Mumbai Khiladis	499

==== Team Attacking Points ====
Team	Points
Telugu Yoddhas	593
Gujarat Giants	485
Odisha Juggernauts	482
Chennai Quick Guns	445
Mumbai Khiladis	404

==== Team Defending Points ====
Team	Points
Telugu Yoddhas	122
Odisha Juggernauts	98
Chennai Quick Guns	72
Gujarat Giants	70
Mumbai Khiladis	60

==== Team Touch Points ====
Team	Points
Gujarat Giants	202
Mumbai Khiladis	182
Telugu Yoddhas	142
Odisha Juggernauts	122
Rajasthan Warriors	102

==== Team All Outs Taken ====
Team	No.
Telugu Yoddhas	6
Mumbai Khiladis	2
Gujarat Giants	2
Chennai Quick Guns	1
Odisha Juggernauts	1

==== Team All Outs Conceded ====
Team	No.
Rajasthan Warriors	4
Mumbai Khiladis	2
Gujarat Giants	2
Odisha Juggernauts	2
Chennai Quick Guns	1
