= Akshay Ganpule =

Indian Kho Kho player

Akshay Prashant Ganpule (born 22 September 1998) is an Indian Kho Kho player who currently plays for the Rajasthan Warriors in the Ultimate Kho Kho.

== Early life ==
Akshay was born on 22 September 1998, in Pune, Maharashtra. He is a graduate in Computer Science from Sir Parashurambhau College.

== Sports achievements ==
Akshay started his sports career at a young age. He initially played for Nava Maharashtra Sangh. He won a gold medal in the 2019 South Asian Games held in Kathmandu, Nepal. He has been a two-time Gold and silver medallist in the Senior National Tournaments. Akshay has also been a four-time gold medallist in the Federation Level Kho Kho Tournaments. After joining the Indian Railways, he was a player in the Railways squad, which won the National Tournaments in 2021. In 2022, he was selected to play in the Ultimate Kho Kho. He plays for the Rajasthan Warriors and was elected as its vice-captain in 2023.

In recognition of his achievements, the Government of Maharashtra conferred him with the Shiv Chhatrapati Award, the highest prestigious sports award honoured annually to the players of Maharashtra by the Government of Maharashtra in India.

== See also ==
- Athletics in India
- Kho Kho
- Sport in India - overview of Sports tradition in India
