= Rajasthan Warriorz =

Team in Ultimate Kho Kho

- Full name: Rajasthan Warriorz
- Nickname: The Warriorz
- Sport: KhoKho
- Founded: 2022
- First season: 2022
- League: Ultimate Kho Kho
- Owner: Capri Sports (Capri Global)
- Head coach: Parthavareddy Brahmanaidu
- Captain: Majahar Jamadar

The Rajasthan Warriorz (RW) are a team in Ultimate Kho Kho (UKK). Majahar Jamadar is the captain whereas Akshay Ganpule is the vice-captain. RW are owned by the Capri Global Group.

== Results ==
Season	League stage position	Furthest stage reached	Opponent	Result	Ref.
2022	6th	League Stage	N/A	Eliminated	
2023-24	6th	League Stage	N/A	Eliminated	
