= 2023–24 Ultimate Kho Kho =

2023-24 Ultimate Kho Kho season
- League: Ultimate Kho Kho
- Sport: Kho Kho
- Defending champions: Odisha Juggernauts (2022)
- Hosts: Jawaharlal Nehru Indoor Stadium
- Duration: 24 December - 14 January 2024
- Teams: 6
- League champions: Gujarat Giants
- Runner-ups: Chennai Quick Guns

Seasons
- 2022 2024–25

The 2023–2024 season of Ultimate Kho Kho was the second edition of the league. It was hosted from 24 December 2023 to 13 January 2024 in Cuttack, Odisha. 6 teams played 34 matches. Gujarat Giants beat Chennai Quick Guns 31–26 in the final.

== History ==
The player draft for the season was held on November 21, 2023, where 145 out of 272 draftable players were selected. A total of 18 players have been retained by the franchises from the previous season.

=== Format ===
A change to the rules was introduced in this season that each tagged defender would always be worth 2 points to the attacking team, as opposed to the format in the previous season where a bonus 3rd point could be earned if an attacker tagged a defender while diving. The rule around Dream Runs was also changed, such that 1 point is earned by a batch of defenders for surviving 3 minutes, and then 1 more point for every 30 seconds afterwards.

=== Prize money ===
The winning team received ₹1 crore (US$100,000), while the runner-ups received ₹50 lakh (US$52,000) and the third-placed team received ₹30 lakh (US$31,000).

=== Popularity ===
The official social media handles for UKK received over 213 million views during the tournament, totalling a 150% increase in popularity.

== Teams ==
Locations of the UKK teams

The six teams are named Chennai Quick Guns, Gujarat Giants, Mumbai Khiladis, Odisha Juggernauts, Rajasthan Warriors, and Telugu Yoddhas.

== Squads ==
=== Chennai Quick Guns ===
==== Attackers ====
Balvir Singh, Jaswant Singh, Manoj Patil, P Narasayya, Sachin Gaur, V Kabilan, Venu Gopal S

==== Defenders ====
Buchannagari Raju, Jeevith Daasari Rao, M Vignesh, Mahesh Madhukar Shinde, N Suresh, P Anand Kumar, Prasad Vijay Patil, Pritam Ankush Chougule, S.Santhru, SibinM, Vijaybhai Vegad

==== All-Rounders ====
Amit Vasant Patil(C), M Vignesh, Madan, P.Jai Prasath, Rajvardhan Shankar Patil, K Ram Mohan, Ramji Kashyap

=== Gujarat Giants ===
==== Attackers ====
Abhinandan Mahadev Patil, Aniket Bhagwan Pote, Bhat Hakmaji Govind, Chinmoy Nandi, Nilesh Sarjerao Patil, Praful Raju Bhange, Ranjan Shridhar Shetty(C), S.Kavin Raj, Sagar Shubhash Lengare, Sarath Kumar Saravanan, Shubham Motiramji Jambhale

==== Defenders ====
Ajay Kumar Mandra, Akshay Sandeep Bhangare, Dhiraj Vinod Bhave, Manoj Sarkar, Mareppa, Rutishbhai Jayantibhai Barde, SagarDeepakraj Potdar, Saleem Khan, Vinayak Sadashiv Pokarde

==== All-Rounders ====
Debendra Nath, TJaggannath Das, Pothi Reddy Siva Reddy, SuyashVishwas Gargate

=== Mumbai Khiladis ===
==== Attackers ====
Abhishek Pathrode, Abishek M S, Avik Singha, Bichu S S, Devendra Dagur, Durvesh Vikas Salunke, Milind Rajendra Kurpe, Rahul Bharat Sawant, Rajesh Kumar, Shubham Kachhi, Sreejesh S, Ummer Ahmad Rathar

==== Defenders ====
Ajay Panchabhai, FaizankhaSherkha Pathan, GajananMaruti Shengal, Gaurav, Gaurav Kandpal, Harish Mohmmad, Rajat Malik, Rohan Bapuso Kore, Rohit Verma, Sourabh Nathaji Ahir, Sribin KP, Srijin J, Vijay Gajanan Hajare(C)

==== All-Rounders ====
Visag S

=== Odisha Juggernauts ===
==== Attackers ====
Darshanapu Sathish, Dinesh Naik S, Lipun Mukhi, Mahesha.P, Manoj Narayanrao Ghotekar, Mukesh Prajapat, Shiv Kumar Sen, Siddheswar Tudu, Sukanath Sing, Suraj Shital Lande

==== Defenders ====
Gowtham M K, Gurjinder Singh, Suresh Kumar, Swayam Satyaprakash Parija, Thungana Vinod Kumar, Vishal

==== All-Rounders ====
Aditya Kudale, Arjun Singh, Avinash Shivaji Desai, Dilip Ratan Khandavi, Dipesh Vijay More(C), Jagannath Murmu, Milind Dilip Chavrekar(C), Nilesh Ananda Jadhav, Subhasish Santra

=== Rajasthan Warriors ===
==== Attackers ====
Ashwani Ranjan, Atla Siva Nagi Reddy, Biswajit Das, Konjengbam Dhananjoy Singh, Majahar Kalandar Jamadar(C), Mohammed Taseen, Mukesh Maurya, Sourabh Shivaji Adavkar, Suresh Shamrao Sawant, Sushant Sanjay Kaldhone

==== Defenders ====
Akshay Ganpule(C), Bhuneshwar Sahu, Jithin B, Mahesh M, Shailesh Mahadev Sankapal, SK.Murtaja Ali, Tapan Pal

==== All-Rounders ====
Abhijit Vasant Patil, Bharat Kumar Pradhan, Dilrajsing Rekha Sengar, Govind Yadav, Hrushikesh Vijay Murchavade, Nikhil B, Sushant Dattatray Hajare, Yalla Satish

=== Telugu Yoddhas ===
==== Attackers ====
Adarsh Dattatray Mohite, Aditya Das, Dhanush K C, Gavara Venkatesh, P Hemachandran, Prajwal K H(C), Sinam Rokeson Singh, Sachin Bhargo, Thokchom Sadananda Meitei, V Subramani

==== Defenders ====
Avdhut Bharat Patil, Bojjam Ranjith, Deepak Vitthal Madhav, Dhruv, Prasad Vaibhav Radye, Sudershan

==== All-Rounders ====
Anukul Sarkar, Arun Ashok Gunki, Arun S. A., Bala Sambi Reddy Pittu, Pratik Kiran Waikar, Rohan Tanaji Shingade

== Points table ==
Pos	Teams	Played	Won	Lost	Tied	No Result	Score Difference	Points	
1	Chennai Quick Guns	10	7	1	2	0	76	25	Qualified For Semi-Final
2	Odisha Juggernauts	10	6	2	2	0	37	23	Qualified For Semi-Final
3	Gujarat Giants	10	6	3	1	0	55	21	Qualified For Semi-Final
4	Telugu Yoddhas	10	6	4	0	0	-5	18	Qualified For Semi-Final
5	Mumbai Khiladis	10	2	7	1	0	-62	10	Eliminated
6	Rajasthan Warriors	10	0	10	0	0	-101	2	Eliminated

Points format:

- 3 points awarded for a win
- 2 points for a tie
- 1 point for a loss by less than 4 points

== League Stage ==
All Matches will be played in Jawaharlal Nehru Indoor Stadium (Cuttack).

=== 24 December 2023 ===
==== Match 1 ====
19:30(IST)

Odisha Juggernauts 35-27 Rajasthan Warriors

Odisha Juggernauts beat Rajasthan Warriors by 8 points. Report

==== Match 2 ====
20:30(IST)

Telugu Yoddhas 46-44 Mumbai Khiladis

Telugu Yoddhas beat Mumbai Khiladis by 2 points. Report

=== 25 December 2023 ===
==== Match 3 ====
19:30(IST)

Rajasthan Warriors 30-41 Gujarat Giants

Gujarat Giants beat Rajasthan Warriors by 11 points. Report

==== Match 4 ====
20:30(IST)

Chennai Quick Guns 38-32 Telugu Yoddhas

Chennai Quick Guns beat Telugu Yoddhas by 6 points. Report

=== 26 December 2023 ===
==== Match 5 ====
19:30(IST)

Gujarat Giants 34-30 Mumbai Khiladis

Gujarat Giants beat Mumbai Khiladis by 4 points Report

==== Match 6 ====
20:30(IST)

Odisha Juggernauts 34-34 Chennai Quick Guns

Match Tied on 34 points each Report

- First tie of UKK history

=== 27 December 2023 ===
==== Match 7 ====
19:30(IST)

Telugu Yoddhas 38-28 Rajasthan Warriors

Telugu Yoddhas beat Rajasthan Warriors by 10 points Report

==== Match 8 ====
20:30(IST)

Mumbai Khiladis 28-31 Odisha Juggernauts

Odisha Juggernauts beat Mumbai Khiladis by 3 points Report

=== 29 December 2023 ===
==== Match 9 ====
19:30(IST)

Rajasthan Warriors 27-31 Chennai Quick Guns

Chennai Quick Guns beat Rajasthan Warriors by 4 points Report

==== Match 10 ====
20:30(IST)

Gujarat Giants 41-24 Telugu Yoddhas

Gujarat Giants beat Telugu Yoddhas by 17 points Report

=== 30 December 2023 ===
==== Match 11 ====
19:30(IST)

Chennai Quick Guns 36-31 Mumbai Khiladis

Chennai Quick Guns beat Mumbai Khiladis by 5 points Report

==== Match 12 ====
20:30(IST)

Odisha Juggernauts 29-34 Gujarat Giants

Gujarat Giants beat Odisha Juggernauts by 5 points Report

=== 31 December 2023 ===
==== Match 13 ====
19:30(IST)

Telugu Yoddhas 29-28 Odisha Juggernauts

Telugu Yoddhas beat Odisha Juggernauts by 1 points Report

==== Match 14 ====
20:30(IST)

Rajasthan Warriors 30-31 Mumbai Khiladis

Mumbai Khiladis beat Rajasthan Warriors by 1 points. Report

=== 1 January 2024 ===
==== Match 15 ====
19:30(IST)

Gujarat Giants 29-35 Chennai Quick Guns

Chennai Quick Guns beat Gujarat Giants by 6 points Report

==== Match 16 ====
20:30(IST)

Rajasthan Warriors 27-34 Telugu Yoddhas

Telugu Yoddhas beat Rajasthan Warriors by 7 points Report

=== 2 January 2024 ===
==== Match 17 ====
19:30(IST)

Chennai Quick Guns 30-30 Odisha Juggernauts

Match Tied on 30 points each Report

==== Match 18 ====
20:30(IST)

Mumbai Khiladis 26-26 Gujarat Giants

Match Tied on 26 points each Report

=== 3 January 2024 ===
==== Match 19 ====
19:30(IST)

Mumbai Khiladis 22-40 Telugu Yoddhas

Telugu Yoddhas beat Mumbai Khiladis by 18 points Report

==== Match 20 ====
20:30(IST)

Rajasthan Warriors 21-32 Odisha Juggernauts

Odisha Juggernauts beat Rajasthan Warriors by 11 points Report

=== 5 January 2024 ===
==== Match 21 ====
19:30(IST)

Telugu Yoddhas 38-30 Chennai Quick Guns

Telugu Yoddhas beat Chennai Quick Guns by 8 points Report

==== Match 22 ====
20:30(IST)

Gujarat Giants 46-22 Rajasthan Warriors

Gujarat Giants beat Rajasthan Warriors by 24 points Report

=== 6 January 2024 ===
==== Match 23 ====
19:30(IST)

Gujarat Giants 27-30 Odisha Juggernauts

Odisha Juggernauts beat Gujarat Giants by 3 points.Report

==== Match 24 ====
20:30(IST)

Mumbai Khiladis 18-41 Chennai Quick Guns

Chennai Quick Guns beat Mumbai Khiladis by 23 points.Report

=== 7 January 2024 ===
==== Match 25 ====
19:30(IST)

Mumbai Khiladis 29-27 Rajasthan Warriors

Mumbai Khiladis beat Rajasthan Warriors by 2 points.Report

==== Match 26 ====
20:30(IST)

Odisha Juggernauts 35-27 Telugu Yoddhas

Odisha Juggernauts beat Telugu Yoddhas by 8 points.Report

=== 8 January 2024 ===
==== Match 27 ====
19:30(IST)

Telugu Yoddhas 22-42 Gujarat Giants

Gujarat Giants beat Telugu Yoddhas by 20 points.Report

==== Match 28 ====
20:30(IST)

Chennai Quick Guns 42-19 Rajasthan Warriors

Chennai Quick Guns beat Rajasthan Warriors by 23 points.Report

=== 9 January 2024 ===
==== Match 29 ====
19:30(IST)

Odisha Juggernauts 34-24 Mumbai Khiladis

Odisha Juggernauts beat Mumbai Khiladis by 10 points.Report

==== Match 30 ====
20:30(IST)

Chennai Quick Guns 38-21 Gujarat Giants

Chennai Quick Guns beat Gujarat Giants by 17 points.Report

== Knockouts ==
Semifinals
1	Chennai Quick Guns	31
4	Telugu Yoddhas	29
3	Gujarat Giants	29
2	Odisha Juggernauts	27

Finals
Chennai Quick Guns	26
Gujarat Giants	31
Third place
Telugu Yoddhas	24
Odisha Juggernauts	32

=== 11 January 2024 ===
==== Semi-Final 1 ====
19:30(IST)

Odisha Juggernauts 27-29 Gujarat Giants

Gujarat Giants beat Odisha Juggernauts by 2 points.

Report

==== Semi-Final 2 ====
20:30(IST)

Chennai Quick Guns 31-29 Telugu Yoddhas

Chennai Quick Guns beat Telugu Yoddhas by 2 points.

Report

=== 13 January 2024 ===
==== 3rd Place Playoff ====
19:30(IST)

Odisha Juggernauts 32-24 Telugu Yoddhas

Odisha Juggernauts beat Telugu Yoddhas by 8 points.Report

==== Final ====
20:00(IST)

Chennai Quick Guns 26-31 Gujarat Giants

Gujarat Giants beat Chennai Quick Guns by 5 points.Report

== Awards ==
Player of the Tournament	Rising Star of the Tournament	Attacker of the Tournament	Defender of the Tournament
Ramji Kashyap (Chennai Quick Guns)	Shubham Thorat (Gujarat Giants)	Pratik Waikar (Telugu Yoddhas)	Aditya Ganpule (Telugu Yoddhas)

== Stats ==
=== Player Stats ===
==== Top Attackers ====
Player	Team	Total Points
Ramji Kashyap	CQG	84
Pratik Waikar	TY	68
Rahul Mandal		58

==== Top Defenders ====
Player	Team	Defending Time
Ramji Kashyap	CQG	33:03
Aditya Ganpule	TY	23:15
Vijay Shinde		21:30

==== Top Wazirs ====
Player	Team	Wazir Points
Pratik Waikar	TY	68
Durvesh Salunke		38
Deepak Sahoo		36

==== Total Sky Dives ====
Player	Team	Count
Ramji Kashyap	CQG	27
Rahul Mandal		16
Suraj Lande		15

==== Total Pole Dives ====
Player	TY	Count
Pratik Waikar	TY	13
Arun Gunki		11
Aniket Pote		7

==== Total High 5s ====
Player (Note: A High 5 is when a player dismisses a minimum of 5 defenders in a single turn.)	Team	Count
Abhinandan Patil	GG	1
Sanket Kadam	GG	1
Pratik Waikar	TY	1

==== Not Outs ====
Player	Team	Count
Dilip Khandavi	OJ	7
Arun Gunki	TY	6
Sumon Barman	CQG	6

==== Total Touch Points ====
Player	Team	Touch Points
Sreejesh S	MK	32
Suyash Gargate		30
Gajanan Shengal		28

==== Total Dive Points ====
Player	Team	Dive Points
Ramji Kashyap	CQG	58
Pratik Waikar	TY	44
Rahul Mandal		40

=== Team Stats ===
==== Team Total Points ====
Player	Team Points
Chennai Quick Guns	412
Gujarat Giants	401
Telugu Yoddhas	383
Odisha Juggernauts	377
Mumbai Khiladis	283

==== Team Attacking Points ====
Player	Attacking Points
Chennai Quick Guns	350
Telugu Yoddhas	342
Gujarat Giants	334
Odisha Juggernauts	314
Mumbai Khiladis	256

==== Team Defending Points ====
Player	Defending Points
Chennai Quick Guns	60
Odisha Juggernauts	57
Gujarat Giants	57
Telugu Yoddhas	37
Mumbai Khiladis	25

==== Team Touch Points ====
Player	Touch Points
Gujarat Giants	176
Odisha Juggernauts	168
Telugu Yoddhas	142
Chennai Quick Guns	136
Mumbai Khiladis	132

==== Team All Outs Taken ====
Player	All Outs Taken
Telugu Yoddhas	2
Mumbai Khiladis	1
Gujarat Giants	1

==== Team All Outs Conceded ====
Player	All Outs Conceded
Mumbai Khiladis	1
Rajasthan Warriors	1
Chennai Quick Guns	1
Telugu Yoddhas	1
