= Chennai Quick Guns =

Team in Ultimate Kho Kho

- Full name: Chennai Quick Guns
- Nickname: Quick Guns
- Short name: CQG
- Sport: Kho kho
- Founded: 2022
- League: Ultimate Kho Kho
- Based in: Chennai, Tamil Nadu

The Chennai Quick Guns (CQG) are a team in Ultimate Kho Kho (UKK). Amit Patil is the captain. CQG are owned by KLO Sports.

== Results ==
Season	League stage position	Furthest stage reached	Opponent	Result	Ref.
2022	4th	Eliminator	Telugu Yoddhas	Lost 61–42	
2023-24	1st	Final	Gujarat Giants	Lost 31-26	
