= Mumbai Khiladis =

Team in Ultimate Kho Kho

- Full name: Mumbai Khiladis
- Nickname: Khiladis
- Short name: MK
- Sport: Kho kho
- Founded: 2022
- League: Ultimate Kho Kho
- Based in: Mumbai, Maharashtra

The Mumbai Khiladis (MK) are a team in Ultimate Kho Kho (UKK). They finished 5th in the inaugural UKK season. Aniket Pote is the captain. MK are owned by Punit Balan.

== History ==
In 2023, MK secured over ₹8.30 crore (US$870,000) in sponsorships.

== Results ==
Season	League stage position	Furthest stage reached	Opponent	Result	Ref.
2022	5th	League Stage	N/A	Eliminated	
2023-24	5th	League Stage	N/A	Eliminated	
