= Gujarat Giants (kho kho) =

Team in Ultimate Kho Kho

- Full name: Gujarat Giants
- Sport: Kho kho
- Founded: 2022
- First season: 2022
- Last season: 2023-24
- League: Ultimate Kho Kho
- Based in: Ahmedabad, Gujarat, India
- Anthem: Garjega Gujarat
- Owner: Adani Sportsline
- Website: gujaratgiants.com

The Gujarat Giants, Ultimate Kho Kho League team is owned by the sports arm of the Adani Group, which also owns other sports teams with the same name (Gujarat Giants) in Pro Kabaddi League, Women’s Premier League, and Legends League Cricket, and the Gulf Giants in the International League T20. The team is one of the founding members of the Ultimate Kho Kho League, which started its first season in 2022.

== Franchise History ==
When the Ultimate Kho Kho League was announced, Adani Sportsline became one of the owners of the team which they named Gujarat Giants.

In the first season of the Ultimate Kho Kho League in 2022, the Gujarat Giants made it to the Playoffs where they were defeated by the Odisha Juggernauts and Telugu Yoddhas. They came back strongly in the second season, winning 6 out of 10 games in the group stage. They continued their winning streak by beating the Odisha Juggernauts in Qualifier 1 and then emerging victorious against the Chennai Quick Guns in the Final, thereby clinching the championship.

== Team history ==
=== 2022 ===
In the inaugural season of the Ultimate Kho Kho League in 2022, the Gujarat Giants marked their entry under the captaincy of Ranjan Shetty. The team boasted notable players like Abhinandan Patil, Akshay Bhangre, Suyash Gargate, Aniket Pote, and Vinayak Pokarde. Their first match against the Mumbai Khiladis saw Aniket Pote spending 2 minutes and 47 seconds on the mat, while Suyash Gargate clocked 55 seconds of running time. Abhinandan Patil emerged as the top scorer for the Giants in that game, notching up 10 points.

Captain Ranjan Shetty secured 12 points against the Mumbai Khiladis and 9 points against the Telugu Yoddhas, contributing significantly to the team's victories. Akshay Bhangre's notable performance included running for 3 minutes and 24 seconds against the Rajasthan Warriors, aiding the Giants in their 47-42 triumph.

Despite topping the group stage table, the Giants faced setbacks in the playoffs, losing to the Odisha Juggernauts in Qualifier 1 and succumbing to the Telugu Yoddhas in Qualifier 2.

=== 2023-24 ===
In the second season of the Ultimate Kho Kho League, the Gujarat Giants held onto key players like Akshay Bhangre, Abhinandan Patil, and Suyash Gargate while adding 22 new players to their roster in the Player Draft. Akshay Bhangre was appointed as the skipper with P Narsayya as his deputy.

Their season kicked off on December 24th with a victory against the Rajasthan Warriors, winning 41-30 . Throughout the tournament, they won 6 out of 10 games, securing the third position in the League stages. They triumphed over the Odisha Juggernauts in Qualifier 1 with a score of 29-27, then faced off against the Chennai Quick Guns in the final, emerging victorious with a 31-26 win to clinch their first tournament title.

Suyash Gargate led the team in Touch Points with 30 for the season. Shubham Thorat played a significant role, clocking 2 minutes and 23 seconds of running time in their opening game. Abhinandan Patil earned 14 points for the team against Mumbai Khiladis. Sanket Kadam's performance contributed to their win against the Telugu Yoddhas with a score of 41-24.

Their biggest victories came against the Rajasthan Warriors and the Telugu Yoddhas, with scores of 46-22 and 42-22 respectively. In Qualifier 1 against the Odisha Juggernauts, Suyash Gargate's 12 points were pivotal in securing their spot in the final. In the final, playing against the Chennai Quick Guns, Sanket Kadam's 6 points helped seal the tournament for the Giants.

== Current Squad ==
Name	Role	Birthday
Abhinandan Patil	All-rounder	19/09/2000
Arnav Patankar	Attacker	20/06/2003
Gavara Venkatesh	Defender	04/08/2002
P Narsayya	All-rounder	06/06/1995
Pabani Sabar	Attacker	17/10/2004
Rupesh Kondhalkar	Attacker	03/11/2005
Sanket Kadam	Attacker	29/05/1999
Shubham Thorat	Attacker	30/07/2003
V Kabilan	Attacker	30/01/2001
V Subramani	All-rounder	09/07/2001
Akshay Bhangre	All-rounder	14/12/1995
Deepak Madhav	Defender	11/02/1994
Faizankha Pathan	All-rounder	13/02/2001
Harish Mohmmad	Attacker	11/08/1998
Ravi Vasave	Defender	02/05/2006
Saleem Khan	Attacker	22/10/1999
Vijesh Kumar	Attacker	26/07/2001
Vinayak Pokarde	All-rounder	15/09/1996
Abhijit Patil	All-rounder	21/06/1991
Alfaj Nadaf	All-rounder	07/08/2005
Bharat Pradhan	All-rounder	15/07/1999
Nilesh Jadhav	All-rounder	30/05/1999
Rajvardhan Patil	All-rounder	01/08/2001
K Ram Mohan	Defender	18/06/2003
Suyash Gargate	All-rounder	06/08/1997

== Results ==
Season	League stage position	Furthest stage reached	Opponent	Result	Ref.
2022	1st	Qualifier 2	Telugu Yoddhas	Lost 61–42	
2023-24	3rd	Final	Chennai Quick Guns	Won 31-26	

== Sponsors ==
Sponsor List
Season 2	Ambuja Cement	Dafa News	Fortune
