= Odisha Juggernauts =

Ultimate Kho Kho team

- Full name: Odisha Juggernauts
- Nickname: Juggernauts
- Short name: OJ
- Sport: Kho kho
- Founded: 2022
- League: Ultimate Kho Kho
- Based in: Odisha

The Odisha Juggernauts (OJ) are a team in Ultimate Kho Kho (UKK). They won the inaugural UKK season by defeating Telugu Yoddhas 46–45 in the final. Odisha Juggernauts' sponsor for the first two seasons has been AM/NS India, which has also partnered with the Odisha government to promote kho-kho in the state.

== Name ==
The Juggernauts are named after Jagannath.

== Results ==
Season	League stage position	Furthest stage reached	Opponent	Result	Ref.
2022	2nd	Final	Telugu Yoddhas	Won 46-45	
2023-24	2nd	Semifinal 1	Gujarat Giants	Lost 29-27	
