= Telugu Yoddhas =

Team in Ultimate Kho Kho

- Full name: Telugu Yoddhas
- Nickname: Yoddhas
- Short name: TY
- Sport: Kho kho
- Founded: 2022
- League: Ultimate Kho Kho
- Based in: Andhra Pradesh / Telangana

The Telugu Yoddhas (TY) are a team in Ultimate Kho Kho (UKK). Pratik Waikar is the captain.

== Results ==
Season	League stage position	Furthest stage reached	Opponent	Result	Ref.
2022	3rd	Final	Odisha Juggernauts	Lost 46-45	
2023-24	4th	Semifinal 2	Chennai Quick Guns	Lost 31-29	
