= Ultimate Kho Kho =

Indian franchise-based Kho-Kho league

- Most recent season or competition: 2023–24 Ultimate Kho Kho
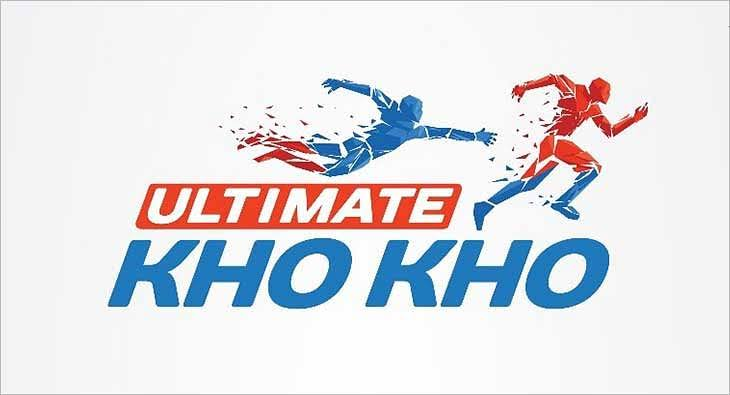
- Sport: Kho Kho
- Founded: 2022
- First season: 2022
- CEO: Tenzing Niyogi
- No. of teams: 6
- Country: India
- Most recent champion: Gujarat Giants (2023–24)
- Most titles: Odisha Juggernauts; Gujarat Giants (1 each)
- Website: Website
- 2023–24 Ultimate Kho Kho

Ultimate Kho Kho, abbreviated as UKK is an Indian franchise-based kho-kho league. Hosted by the Kho Kho Federation of India, it was founded in 2022. The first season had a viewership of 64 million, 41 million of which came from India, making UKK the third-most viewed non-cricket sports tournament in India after the Pro Kabaddi League and the Indian Super League.

== History ==
Several changes were made to the standard rules of kho-kho in UKK in order to make the game more exciting and presentable on television. Sony Pictures Network India signed a 5-year deal to broadcast UKK, and will invest ₹200 crore (US$21 million) into the league over the 5 years.

There are plans to launch a women's version of UKK in a few years' time. Future editions of UKK will expand to have eight to ten teams (potentially including a team from Northeast India), with venues in multiple cities to be used. It was confirmed that for Season 3, some foreign players will participate.

Before the start of the second season, UKK became the first Indian sports league to secure private equity-based funding, receiving it from a UK-based group.

== Format ==
UKK uses a modified set of rules referred to by the International Kho Kho Federation as the "fast format", as opposed to the standard "test format". The following modifications apply:

- Only 7 players from the attacking (chasing) team are on the field.
- The playing field is only 22 meters long and 16 meters wide. (Note: Certain other dimensions of the playing field are changed as well. For example, the boxes which the sitting chasers squat in have been turned into 40cm squares.)
- 2 points are scored per tag.
- A 30-second break is taken between the dismissal of one batch and the entry of the next batch. (Note: The attacking team can select any of its on-court players to be the active attacker at the start of the new batch. A kho does not need to be given by the attacker after the break.)
- If a batch of defenders can avoid being completely dismissed for at least 3 minutes (known as a "Dream Run"), they earn 1 point, and then an extra point for every 30 seconds survived afterwards.
- One attacking player (known as the wazir) may run in any direction when acting as the active attacker.
- The attacking team can take a powerplay in each of their attacking turns during which they have two wazirs. Each powerplay lasts until all 3 defenders of the current batch are out.
- Each team's turn to score/defend lasts 7 minutes, with the break time between turns also shortened.
- Tiebreaker (named "Minimum Chase"): Each team gets one additional turn to score (with the powerplay being active), and the team that scores its first point the fastest wins.

The game is split into two innings, each of which is split into two turns of seven minutes each. An interval of 3 minutes is taken after the end of the first inning, while a break of 2 minutes is taken after the end of the first and third turns respectively.

== Teams ==
Locations of the UKK teams

Team	City	Debut	Head Coach
Chennai Quick Guns	Chennai	2022	
Gujarat Giants	Ahmedabad	2022	
Mumbai Khiladis	Mumbai	2022	
Odisha Juggernauts	Bhubaneswar	2022	
Rajasthan Warriors	Jaipur	2022	
Telugu Yoddhas	Hyderabad	2022	

== Editions and results ==
Season	Final				Teams	Player of the Season	Ref
Season	Winner	Scoreline	Runner-up	Venue	Teams	Player of the Season	Ref
2022	Odisha Juggernauts	46–45	Telugu Yoddhas	Shree Shiv Chhatrapati Sports Complex, Pune	6	Ramji Kashyap	
2023–24	Gujarat Giants	31–26	Chennai Quick Guns	Jawaharlal Nehru Indoor Stadium, Cuttack	6	Ramji Kashyap	

== Team performance ==
=== By season ===
Team	CQG	GG	MK	OJ	RW	TY
2022	4th	3rd	5th	C	6th	RU
2023–24	RU	C	5th	3rd	6th	4th

=== By position ===
Year	1st	2nd	3rd	4th	5th	6th
2022	GG	OJ	TY	CQG	MK	RW
2023–24	CQG	OJ	GG	TY	MK	RW

== Awards ==
Season	Player of the Tournament	Rising Star of the Tournament (Note: Known in Season 1 as the Young Player of the Tournament)	Attacker of the Tournament	Defender of the Tournament	Ref
2022	Ramji Kashyap of Chennai Quick Guns	Madan of Chennai Quick Guns	Abhinandan Patil of Gujarat Giants	Deepak Madhav of Telugu Yoddhas	
2023–24	Ramji Kashyap of Chennai Quick Guns	Shubham Thorat of Gujarat Giants	Pratik Waikar of Telugu Yoddhas	Aditya Ganpule of Telugu Yoddhas	

== See also ==
- Kho Kho World Cup
- Sport in India
- Pro Kabaddi League
- World Chase Tag
