= Sri Lanka men's national kho kho team =

Sri Lankan men's kho kho team

Sri Lanka
- Association: Kho Kho Federation of Sri Lanka
- Confederation: International Kho Kho Federation (IKKF)

World Cup
- Appearances: 1 (first in 2025)
- Best result: Quarter-finals (2025)

Asian Kho Kho Championship
- Appearances: 4 (first in 1996)
- Best result: 4th (2016, 2023)

The Sri Lanka men's national kho kho team represents Sri Lanka in international men's Kho Kho competitions. It is governed by the Kho Kho Federation of Sri Lanka and is a member of the International Kho Kho Federation (IKKF). Sri Lanka reached the quarter-finals of the 2025 Kho Kho World Cup, its only World Cup appearance to date, where it lost 100–40 to hosts India. The team has also played at the Asian Kho Kho Championship, finishing fourth in 2016 and 2023.

== History ==
=== Asian Championship (1996–2023) ===
Sri Lanka took part in the first Asian Kho Kho Championship, held in Kolkata in 1996, and in the 2000 edition in Dhaka. At the 2016 edition in Indore and the 2023 edition in Assam, Sri Lanka finished fourth, in each case losing the third-place match.

=== 2025 Kho Kho World Cup ===
Sri Lanka entered the inaugural Kho Kho World Cup, held at the Indira Gandhi Indoor Stadium in New Delhi from 13 to 19 January 2025. It lost its opening match 56–24 to Bangladesh, then won its other three group matches, beating the United States (111–22), South Korea (91–22) and Poland (105–40) to reach the quarter-finals.

In the quarter-final on 17 January, Sri Lanka lost 100–40 to India, who went on to win the tournament.

== Tournament history ==
=== Kho Kho World Cup ===
Kho Kho World Cup
Year	Host city	Position
2025	New Delhi, India	Quarter-finals

Kho Kho World Cup record
Year	Result	Position	Pld	W	D*	L
(Sri Lanka) 2025	Quarter-finals	Top 8	5	3	0	2
Total	1/1	0 Titles	5	3	0	2

=== Asian Kho Kho Championship ===
Asian Kho Kho Championship
Year	Host	Position
1996	Kolkata, India	Participated
2000	Dhaka, Bangladesh	Participated
2016	Indore, India	4th
2023	Assam, India	4th

== Recent results and fixtures ==
=== 2025 match results ===
Competition	Date	Round	Opponent	Score	Venue
World Cup	14 January 2025	Group stage	Bangladesh	24–56	Indira Gandhi Indoor Stadium, New Delhi
World Cup	15 January 2025	Group stage	United States	111–22	Indira Gandhi Indoor Stadium, New Delhi
World Cup	15 January 2025	Group stage	South Korea	91–22	Indira Gandhi Indoor Stadium, New Delhi
World Cup	16 January 2025	Group stage	Poland	105–40	Indira Gandhi Indoor Stadium, New Delhi
World Cup	17 January 2025	Quarter-final	India	40–100	Indira Gandhi Indoor Stadium, New Delhi

== See also ==
- Sri Lanka women's national kho kho team
- India men's national kho kho team
- Kho Kho World Cup
- Asian Kho Kho Championship
- International Kho Kho Federation
