= South Africa men's national kho kho team =

South African men's kho kho team

South Africa
- Association: Kho Kho Federation of South Africa
- Confederation: International Kho Kho Federation
- Captain: Nhlalwenhle Senzo Khoza

International record
- First international: v. Ghana at Indira Gandhi Indoor Stadium, New Delhi (14 January 2025)
- Last international: v. India at Indira Gandhi Indoor Stadium, New Delhi (18 January 2025)

World Cup
- Appearances: 1 (first in 2025)
- Best result: Semi-finals (2025)

The South Africa men's national kho kho team represents South Africa in international men's Kho Kho competitions. It is governed by the Kho Kho Federation of South Africa and is a member of the International Kho Kho Federation (IKKF). The team reached the semi-finals of the 2025 Kho Kho World Cup, its only World Cup appearance to date, where it lost to hosts India.

== History ==
=== 2025 Kho Kho World Cup ===
South Africa entered the inaugural Kho Kho World Cup, held at the Indira Gandhi Indoor Stadium in New Delhi from 13 to 19 January 2025, and was placed in Group B. In its first match, on 14 January, it beat Ghana 87–32, South Africa's first win in World Cup history, and the same day beat the Netherlands 122–14. It then beat Argentina 104–20 before losing 56–32 to Iran, who won the group, leaving South Africa as group runners-up with three wins from four matches.

In the quarter-final South Africa beat the Group D winners, England, 58–38. In the semi-final on 18 January it lost to India 62–42, having pushed the unbeaten hosts hard. South Africa's women's team also reached the semi-finals, where they lost to India 66–16.

== Tournament history ==
=== Kho Kho World Cup ===
Kho Kho World Cup
Year	Host city	Position
2025	New Delhi, India	Semi-finals

Kho Kho World Cup record
Year	Result	Position	Pld	W	D*	L
(South Africa) 2025	Semi-finals	Top 4	6	4	0	2
Total	1/1	0 Titles	6	4	0	2

== Recent results and fixtures ==
=== 2025 match results ===
Competition	Date	Round	Opponent	Score	Venue
World Cup	14 January 2025	Group B	Ghana	87–32	Indira Gandhi Indoor Stadium, New Delhi
World Cup	14 January 2025	Group B	Netherlands	122–14	Indira Gandhi Indoor Stadium, New Delhi
World Cup	15 January 2025	Group B	Argentina	104–20	Indira Gandhi Indoor Stadium, New Delhi
World Cup	16 January 2025	Group B	Iran	32–56	Indira Gandhi Indoor Stadium, New Delhi
World Cup	17 January 2025	Quarter-final	England	58–38	Indira Gandhi Indoor Stadium, New Delhi
World Cup	18 January 2025	Semi-final	India	42–62	Indira Gandhi Indoor Stadium, New Delhi

== Players ==
=== Captains ===
Nhlalwenhle Senzo Khoza captained South Africa at the 2025 World Cup.

== See also ==
- South Africa women's national kho kho team
- India men's national kho kho team
- Kho Kho World Cup
- International Kho Kho Federation
