= 2014 UAE Royals season =

2014 UAE Royals
- 2014 record: 2 wins, 0 losses
- Owner(s): Ace Ventures
- President/CEO: Sachin Gadoya and Sawan Ravani
- Coach: John-Laffnie de Jager
- Stadium: Hamdan bin Mohammed bin Rashid Sports Complex
- Television coverage: Abu Dhabi Media

The 2014 UAE Royals season is the inaugural season of the franchise playing in the International Premier Tennis League (IPTL).

== Season recap ==
=== Founding of franchise ===
On 21 January 2014, IPTL announced that one of the charter franchises for the league's inaugural 2014 season would be based in the Middle East. On 2 March 2014, IPTL revealed that the Middle East franchise would play its home matches in Dubai, United Arab Emirates. The team was founded by Ace Ventures, a group of investors led by Sachin Gadoya, co-founder and chief executive officer of Musafir.com, an Internet-based travel agency, along with his friends Sawan Ravani, Rahul Saharia, Kaushal Majithia, Chirag Vora and Kunal Bansal.

=== Inaugural draft ===
The Dubai franchise participated in the IPTL inaugural draft on 2 March 2014, in Dubai, United Arab Emirates. Players selected by Dubai were

Player	IPTL Category
Men
(Serbia) Novak Djokovic (Serbian: Новак Ђоковић)	Icon players
(Serbia) Janko Tipsarević (Serbian: Јанко Типсаревић)	Category D
(Croatia) Goran Ivanišević	Past champions
(Serbia) Nenad Zimonjić (Serbian: Ненад Зимоњић)	Doubles players
(Tunisia) Malek Jaziri (Arabic: مالك الجزيري)	Uncategorized
Women
(Denmark) Caroline Wozniacki	Icon players
(Switzerland) Martina Hingis	Category C

=== Team name ===
By May 2014, the team was being referred to as the UAE Falcons. By June 2014, the Falcons had become known as the UAE Royals.

=== Home venue ===
On 25 June 2014, the Royals announced that their home matches would be played at the Hamdan bin Mohammed bin Rashid Sports Complex.

=== Player transactions ===
On 25 June 2014, the Royals announced that they had signed Richard Gasquet. On 22 August 2014, the Royals announced that the team had signed Eugenie Bouchard during Wimbledon. A team roster posted by the Royals on Facebook excluded Janko Tipsarević and Martina Hingis who were presumably released following the signings of Gasquet and Bouchard. On 19 October 2014, the Royals announced that they had signed Marin Čilić and released Gasquet. On 24 November 2014, Bouchard pulled out from the competition due to an injury and was replaced by Kristina Mladenovic.

=== First coach ===
On 27 October 2014, John-Laffnie de Jager was named the Royals' first coach.

== Event chronology ==
- 21 January 2014: IPTL announced that one of the charter franchises for the league's inaugural 2014 season would be in the Middle East.
- 2 March: IPTL revealed that the Middle East franchise will play in Dubai, United Arab Emirates. The Dubai franchise participated in the IPTL inaugural draft.
- 10 May: The Dubai franchise was referred to as the UAE Falcons.
- 25 June: The Falcons' name is changed to the UAE Royals.
- 25 June: The Royals announced that their home matches would be played at the Hamdan bin Mohammed bin Rashid Sports Complex.
- 25 June: The Royals announced that they had signed Richard Gasquet. Janko Tipsarević was later apparently released.
- 22 August: The Royals announced that they had signed Eugenie Bouchard. Martina Hingis was later apparently released.
- 19 October: the Royals announced that they had signed Marin Čilić and released Richard Gasquet.
- 27 October: John-Laffnie de Jager was named the Royals' first coach.
- 24 November: The Royals announced Eugenie Bouchard withdrawn from the competition due to an injury. She was replaced by Kristina Mladenovic.
- 28 November: The Royals opened their inaugural season with a 29–24 victory on the road against the Manila Mavericks.
- 30 November: The Royals lost to the Indian Aces, 28–20, in a matchup of two previously unbeaten teams. The Royals' record fell to 2 wins and 1 loss, and they dropped out of first place in the league standings.

== Match log ==
Legend
Royals Win	Royals Loss
Home team in CAPS (including coin-flip winners)

Match	Date	Venue and location	Result and details	Record
1	28 November	Mall of Asia Arena; Pasay, Metropolitan Manila, Philippines	UAE Royals 29, MANILA MAVERICKS 24 * LS: Goran Ivanišević (Royals) 6, Carlos Moyá (Mavericks) 5 * MD: Marin Čilić/Nenad Zimonjić (Royals) 6, Treat Huey/Jo-Wilfried Tsonga (Mavericks) 4 * XD: Kristina Mladenovic/Nenad Zimonjić (Royals) 6, Maria Sharapova/Andy Murray (Mavericks) 4 * WS: Maria Sharapova (Mavericks) 6, Kristina Mladenovic (Royals) 5 * MS: Marin Čilić (Royals) 6, Andy Murray (Mavericks) 5	1-0
2	29 November	Mall of Asia Arena; Pasay, Metropolitan Manila, Philippines	UAE Royals 28, SINGAPORE SLAMMERS 22 * MS: Marin Čilić (Royals) 6, Tomáš Berdych (Slammers) 4 * MD: Tomáš Berdych/Nick Kyrgios (Slammers) 6, Marin Čilić/Nenad Zimonjić (Royals) 5 * WS: Kristina Mladenovic (Royals) 6, Daniela Hantuchová (Slammers) 1 * XD: Daniela Hantuchová/Nick Kyrgios (Slammers) 6, Kristina Mladenovic/Nenad Zimonjić (Royals) 5; ***Nick Kyrgios substituted for Bruno Soares * LS: Goran Ivanišević (Royals) 6, Patrick Rafter (Slammers) 5	2-0
3	30 November	Mall of Asia Arena; Pasay, Metropolitan Manila, Philippines	Indian Aces 28, UAE ROYALS 20 * WS: Kristina Mladenovic (Royals) 6, Ana Ivanovic (Aces) 4 * XD: Sania Mirza/Rohan Bopanna (Aces) 6, Kristina Mladenovic/Nenad Zimonjić (Royals) 3 * MD: Rohan Bopanna/Gaël Monfils (Aces) 6, Marin Čilić/Nenad Zimonjić (Royals) 4 * MS: Gaël Monfils (Aces) 6, Malek Jaziri (Royals) 3; ***Malek Jaziri substituted for Marin Čilić * LS: Fabrice Santoro (Aces) 6, Goran Ivanišević (Royals) 4	2-1
4	2 December	Singapore Indoor Stadium; Singapore	UAE Royals vs. Indian Aces	
5	3 December	Singapore Indoor Stadium; Singapore	UAE Royals vs. Manila Mavericks	
6	4 December	Singapore Indoor Stadium; Singapore	UAE Royals at SINGAPORE SLAMMERS	
7	6 December	Indira Gandhi Indoor Stadium; New Delhi, Delhi, India	UAE Royals vs. Singapore Slammers	
8	7 December	Indira Gandhi Indoor Stadium; New Delhi, Delhi, India	UAE Royals vs. Manila Mavericks	
9	8 December	Indira Gandhi Indoor Stadium; New Delhi, Delhi, India	UAE Royals at INDIAN ACES	
10	11 December	Hamdan bin Mohammed bin Rashid Sports Complex; Dubai, United Arab Emirates	Manila Mavericks at UAE ROYALS	
11	12 December	Hamdan bin Mohammed bin Rashid Sports Complex; Dubai, United Arab Emirates	Indian Aces at UAE ROYALS	
12	13 December	Hamdan bin Mohammed bin Rashid Sports Complex; Dubai, United Arab Emirates	Singapore Slammers at UAE ROYALS	

Key: MS = men's singles; MD = men's doubles; WS = women's singles; XD = mixed doubles; LS = legends' singles; OT = overtime (additional games played in extended fifth sets); SO = men's singles super shoot-out

== Roster ==
- (Canada) Eugenie Bouchard – injured, did not play
- (Croatia) Marin Čilić
- (Serbia) Novak Djokovic (Serbian: Новак Ђоковић)
- (Croatia) Goran Ivanišević
- (Tunisia) Malek Jaziri (Arabic: مالك الجزيري)
- (France) Kristina Mladenovic
- (Denmark) Caroline Wozniacki
- (Serbia) Nenad Zimonjić (Serbian: Ненад Зимоњић)

== Television coverage ==
On 22 August 2014, IPTL announced it had reached an agreement for the Middle East and North Africa television broadcasting rights with Abu Dhabi Media.
