= 2014 Indian Aces season =

Indian Aces debuted in the 2014 IPTL, facing top global teams

2014 Indian Aces
- International Premier Tennis League Champions
- 2014 record: 5 wins, 2 losses
- Owner(s): Micromax Informatics Ltd.
- President/CEO: Rahul Sharma
- Coach: Fabrice Santoro
- Captain: Fabrice Santoro
- Stadium: Indira Gandhi Indoor Stadium
- Television coverage: STAR Sports

The 2014 Indian Aces season (officially the 2014 Micromax Indian Aces season pursuant to a sponsorship agreement with Micromax Informatics Ltd., the team's current owner) is the inaugural season of the franchise playing in the International Premier Tennis League (IPTL).

== Season recap ==
=== Founding of franchise ===
On 21 January 2014, IPTL announced that one of the charter franchises for the league's inaugural 2014 season would be based in Delhi. On 19 June 2014, an IPTL press release revealed to the general public that the owner of the Indian franchise was Micromax Informatics Ltd. which preferred to have the team play its home matches in New Delhi and not in Mumbai. A group called PVP Ventures led by entrepreneur Prasad V Potluri (Telugu: ప్రసాద్ వి పొట్లూరి) and cricket legend Sachin Tendulkar had been the original franchise owners with a plan to play home matches in Mumbai. While league managing director Mahesh Bhupathi said PVP Ventures had been replaced by Micromax, because PVP missed a payment deadline, PVP said it had withdrawn from the league due to lack a of clarity over how IPTL's business model was progressing and disagreements over player contracts. PVP did not want the team to be solely responsible for payment of player salaries and favored the league being obligated as well.

=== Inaugural draft ===
The Indian Aces participated in the IPTL inaugural draft on 2 March 2014, in Dubai, United Arab Emirates. Players selected by Aces were

Player	IPTL Category
Men
(Spain) Rafael Nadal (Note: Nadal was injured and did not play. He was replaced on the Aces roster by Roger Federer.)	Icon players
(United States) Pete Sampras	Icon players
(France) Gaël Monfils	Category B
(France) Fabrice Santoro	Past champions
(India) Rohan Bopanna	Doubles players
Women
(Serbia) Ana Ivanovic	Category B
(India) Sania Mirza	Category D

=== Team name ===
By May 2014, the team was named the Indian Aces.

=== Home venue ===
On 25 July 2014, the Aces announced that their home matches would be played at Indira Gandhi Indoor Stadium in New Delhi, Delhi.

=== Injury to Rafael Nadal and signing of Roger Federer ===
On 22 September 2014, the Aces announced that Rafael Nadal will not play due to an injury. As a replacement, the Aces signed Roger Federer.

=== First coach ===
On 27 October 2014, Fabrice Santoro was named the Aces' first coach.

== Event chronology ==
- 21 January 2014: IPTL announced that one of the charter franchises for the league inaugural 2014 season would be in India.
- 2 March: The Delhi franchise participated in the IPTL inaugural draft.
- 10 May: The Delhi franchise was named the Indian Aces.
- 25 July: The Aces announced that their home matches would be played at Indira Gandhi Indoor Stadium in New Delhi, Delhi.
- 22 September: The Aces signed Roger Federer to replace Rafael Nadal who will not play due to an injury.
- 27 October: Fabrice Santoro was named the Aces' first coach.
- 28 November: The Indian Aces defeated the Singapore Slammers, 26–16, in the first match in IPTL history. Rohan Bopanna served the first point of the league's inaugural match.
- 30 November: The Aces defeated the UAE Royals, 28–20, in a matchup of two previously unbeaten teams. The Aces improved their record to 3 wins and 0 losses and moved into first place in the league standings.
- 3 December: The Aces suffer their first defeat in the 2014 season to the home team, Singapore Slammers.
- 13 December The Aces finish at the top of the league table and are subsequently declared IPTL champions of 2014.

== Match log ==
Legend
Aces Win	Aces Loss
Home team in CAPS (including coin-flip winners)

Match	Date	Venue and location	Result and details	Record
1	28 November	Mall of Asia Arena; Pasay, Metropolitan Manila, Philippines	INDIAN ACES 26 vs. Singapore Slammers 16 * XD: Sania Mirza/Rohan Bopanna (Aces) 6, Daniela Hantuchová/Bruno Soares (Slammers) 4 * LS: Fabrice Santoro (Aces) 6, Patrick Rafter (Slammers) 5 * MD: Rohan Bopanna/Gaël Monfils (Aces) 2, Tomáš Berdych/Nick Kyrgios (Slammers) 6 * WS: Ana Ivanovic (Aces) 6, Daniela Hantuchová (Slammers) 0 * MS: Gaël Monfils (Aces) 6, Lleyton Hewitt (Slammers) 1	1–0
2	29 November	Mall of Asia Arena; Pasay, Metropolitan Manila, Philippines	Indian Aces 24 vs. MANILA MAVERICKS 15 * LS: Fabrice Santoro (Aces) 6, Daniel Nestor (Mavericks) 1; ***Daniel Nestor substituted for Carlos Moyá * MD: Rohan Bopanna/Gaël Monfils (Aces) 0, Treat Huey/Jo-Wilfried Tsonga (Mavericks) 6 * MS: Gaël Monfils (Aces) 6, Andy Murray (Mavericks) 4 * XD: Sania Mirza/Rohan Bopanna (Aces) 6, Maria Sharapova/Andy Murray (Mavericks) 1 * WS: Ana Ivanovic (Aces) 6, Maria Sharapova (Mavericks) 3	2–0
3	30 November	Mall of Asia Arena; Pasay, Metropolitan Manila, Philippines	Indian Aces 28 vs. UAE ROYALS 20 * WS: Ana Ivanovic (Aces) 4, Kristina Mladenovic (Royals) 6 * XD: Sania Mirza/Rohan Bopanna (Aces) 6, Kristina Mladenovic/Nenad Zimonjić (Royals) 3 * MD: Rohan Bopanna/Gaël Monfils (Aces) 6, Marin Čilić/Nenad Zimonjić (Royals) 4 * MS: Gaël Monfils (Aces) 6, Malek Jaziri (Royals) 3; ***Malek Jaziri substituted for Marin Čilić * LS: Fabrice Santoro (Aces) 6, Goran Ivanišević (Royals) 4	3–0
4	2 December	Singapore Indoor Stadium; Singapore	Indian Aces 30 vs. UAE Royals 11 * WS: Ana Ivanovic (Aces) 6, Kristina Mladenovic (Royals) 2 * XD: Sania Mirza/Rohan Bopanna (Aces) 6, Kristina Mladenovic/Nenad Zimonjić (Royals) 5 * MS: Gaël Monfils (Aces) 6, Marin Čilić (Royals) 1 * LS: Fabrice Santoro (Aces) 6, Goran Ivanišević (Royals) 2 * MD: Rohan Bopanna/Gaël Monfils (Aces) 6, Nenad Zimonjić/Marin Čilić (Royals) 1	4–0
5	3 December	Singapore Indoor Stadium; Singapore	Indian Aces 23 vs. SINGAPORE SLAMMERS 24 * WS: Ana Ivanovic (Aces) 4, Serena Williams (Slammers) 6 * XD: Rohan Bopanna/Sania Mirza (Aces) 6, Serena Williams/Tomáš Berdych (Slammers) 3 * LS: Fabrice Santoro (Aces) 6, Andre Agassi (Slammers) 2 * MS: Gaël Monfils (Aces) 2, Tomáš Berdych (Slammers) 6 * MD: Rohan Bopanna/Gaël Monfils (Aces) 6, Nick Kyrgios/Lleyton Hewitt (Slammers) 5 * SO: Gaël Monfils (Aces) 0, Tomáš Berdych (Slammers) 1	4–1
6	4 December	Singapore Indoor Stadium; Singapore	Indian Aces 20 vs. Manila Mavericks 25; *LS: Cédric Pioline (Aces) 4, Mark Philippoussis (Mavericks) 6; ***Cédric Pioline substituted for Fabrice Santoro * WS: Ana Ivanovic (Aces) 6, Kirsten Flipkens (Mavericks) 2 * XD: Rohan Bopanna/Sania Mirza (Aces) 2, Kirsten Flipkens/Daniel Nestor (Mavericks) 6 * MD: Gaël Monfils/Rohan Bopanna (Aces) 2, Treat Huey/Jo-Wilfried Tsonga (Mavericks) 6 * MS: Gaël Monfils (Aces) 6, Jo-Wilfried Tsonga (Mavericks) 3	4–2
7	6 December	Indira Gandhi Indoor Stadium; New Delhi, Delhi, India	Manila Mavericks 25 vs. INDIAN ACES 26 * MXD: Rohan Bopanna/Sania Mirza (Aces) 5, Daniel Nestor/Kirsten Flipkens (Mavericks) 6 * MLS: Cédric Pioline (Aces) 4, Mark Philippoussis (Mavericks) 6 * MD: Gaël Monfils/Rohan Bopanna (Aces) 6, Jo-Wilfried Tsonga/Treat Huey (Mavericks) 5 * MS: Gaël Monfils (Aces) 4, Jo-Wilfried Tsonga (Mavericks) 6 * WS: Ana Ivanovic (Aces) 6, Kirsten Flipkens (Mavericks) 2 * SO: Gaël Monfils (Aces) 1, Jo-Wilfried Tsonga (Mavericks) 0	5-2
8	7 December	Indira Gandhi Indoor Stadium; New Delhi, Delhi, India	Singapore Slammers 17 vs. INDIAN ACES 26 * LS: Pete Sampras (Aces) 2, Patrick Rafter (Slammers) 6 * XD: Sania Mirza/Roger Federer (Aces) 6, Nick Kyrgios/Daniela Hantuchová (Slammers) 0 * MD: Roger Federer/Rohan Bopanna (Aces) 6, Lleyton Hewitt/Nick Kyrgios (Slammers) 2 * MS: Roger Federer (Aces) 6, Tomáš Berdych (Slammers) 4 * WS: Ana Ivanovic (Aces) 6, Daniela Hantuchová (Slammers) 5	6-2
9	8 December	Indira Gandhi Indoor Stadium; New Delhi, Delhi, India	UAE Royals 29 vs. INDIAN ACES 22 * WS: Ana Ivanovic (Aces) 5, Kristina Mladenovic (Royals) 6 * LS: ***Fabrice Santoro substituted for Pete Sampras 3, Goran Ivanišević (Royals) 6 * MX: Sania Mirza/Roger Federer (Aces) 2, Kristina Mladenovic/Nenad Zimonjić (Royals) 6 * MD: Roger Federer/Gaël Monfils (Aces) 6, Nenad Zimonjić/Novak Djokovic (Royals) 5 * MS: Roger Federer (Aces) 6, Novak Djokovic (Royals) 5	6-3
10	11 December	Hamdan bin Mohammed bin Rashid Sports Complex; Dubai, United Arab Emirates	INDIAN ACES 28 vs. Singapore Slammers 24 * WS: Ana Ivanovic (Aces) 6, Daniela Hantuchová (Slammers) 5 * LS: Fabrice Santoro (Aces) 6, Patrick Rafter (Slammers) 3 * XD: Sania Mirza/Rohan Bopanna (Aces) 6, Daniela Hantuchová/Bruno Soares (Slammers) 5 * MD: Rohan Bopanna/Gaël Monfils (Aces) 6, Lleyton Hewitt/Bruno Soares (Slammers) 3 * MS: Gaël Monfils (Aces) 4, Tomáš Berdych (Slammers) 8	7–3
11	12 December	Hamdan bin Mohammed bin Rashid Sports Complex; Dubai, United Arab Emirates	Manila Mavericks 23 vs. Indian Aces 28 * LS: Fabrice Santoro (Aces) 6, Mark Philippoussis (Mavericks) 3 * MS: Gaël Monfils (Aces) 6, Jo-Wilfried Tsonga (Mavericks) 2 * MXD: Rohan Bopanna/Sania Mirza (Aces) 6, Daniel Nestor/Kirsten Flipkens (Mavericks) 4 * WS: Ana Ivanovic (Aces) 6, Kirsten Flipkens (Mavericks) 3 * MD: Rohan Bopanna/Gaël Monfils (Aces) 3, Jo-Wilfried Tsonga/Daniel Nestor (Mavericks) 6	8-3
12	13 December	Hamdan bin Mohammed bin Rashid Sports Complex; Dubai, United Arab Emirates	Indian Aces vs. UAE Royals	

Key: MS = men's singles; MD = men's doubles; WS = women's singles; XD = mixed doubles; LS = legends' singles; OT = overtime (additional games played in extended fifth sets); SO = men's singles super shoot-out

== Roster ==
- (France) Fabrice Santoro – Player-Coach
- (India) Rohan Bopanna
- (Switzerland) Roger Federer
- (Serbia) Ana Ivanovic
- (India) Sania Mirza
- (France) Gaël Monfils
- (Spain) Rafael Nadal – injured, will not play
- (United States) Pete Sampras

== Player transactions ==
- 22 September 2014: The Aces signed Roger Federer to replace Rafael Nadal who will not play due to an injury.

== Television coverage ==
Television coverage of Aces matches in India will be provided by STAR Sports.
