= 2014 Manila Mavericks season =

2014 Manila Mavericks
- 2014 record: 5 wins, 4 losses
- Home record: 1 win, 2 losses
- Road record: 1 wins, 1 loss
- Neutral-site record: 3 win, 1 loss
- Games won: 216
- Games lost: 206
- Owner(s): Hans T. Sy; Jean Henri D. Lhuillier; Kevin Belmonte; Haresh Hiranand; Bala Swaminathan
- Coach: Treat Huey
- Stadium: Mall of Asia Arena
- Television coverage: ABS-CBN

The 2014 Manila Mavericks season is the inaugural season of the franchise playing in the International Premier Tennis League (IPTL).

== Season recap ==
=== Founding of franchise ===
On 21 January 2014, IPTL announced that one of the charter franchises for the league's inaugural 2014 season would be based in Bangkok.

=== Inaugural draft ===
The Bangkok franchise (as the Mavericks were still known at the time) participated in the IPTL inaugural draft on 2 March 2014, in Dubai, United Arab Emirates. Players selected by Bangkok were

Player	IPTL Category
Men
(United Kingdom) Andy Murray	Icon players
(France) Jo-Wilfried Tsonga	Category A
(Spain) Carlos Moyá	Past champions
(Canada) Daniel Nestor	Doubles players
Women
(Belarus) Victoria Azarenka	Icon players
(Belgium) Kirsten Flipkens	Category D

=== Move to Manila ===
On 10 May 2014, before the founder and owner of the franchise had been revealed to the general public, IPTL announced that the Bangkok franchise would be moved to Manila, Philippines due to political unrest in Thailand. On 19 June 2014, IPTL introduced Francis Lumen as the owner of the Manila franchise. The ownership group that moved the team to Manila comprises Filipinos Hans T. Sy, Jean Henri D. Lhuillier, Kevin Belmonte and Haresh Hiranand along with Bala Swaminathan. Sy is president of SM Prime Holdings, inc., the largest shopping mall and retail operator in the Philippines. Lhuillier is an entrepreneur and diplomat. He is president and chief executive officer of P.J. Lhuillier Incorporated, a conglomerate in the pawnbroker, financial services, retail, hotel and restaurant management, information technology, sports, and real estate industries. Lhuillier is also the honorary consul general of San Marino to the Philippines.

=== Team name ===
By June 2014, the Manila franchise had been named the Manila Mavericks.

=== Home venue ===
On 23 July 2014, the Mavericks announced that their home matches would be played at Smart Araneta Coliseum in Quezon City, Metro Manila. On 29 August 2014, IPTL announced that the Mall of Asia Arena in Pasay, Metro Manila, the first choice as a home for the Mavericks, had opened up the dates of the team's home matches making it possible for the Mavericks to play there.

=== Maria Sharapova and Treat Huey join the team ===
On 23 July 2014, the Mavericks announced that they had signed Maria Sharapova (Russian: Мари́я Шара́пова) to replace Victoria Azarenka who would be unable to play for the team due to an ankle injury. The Mavericks also signed the top-ranked Filipino player Treat Huey.

=== First coach ===
On 27 October 2014, Treat Huey was named the Mavericks' first coach.

== Event chronology ==
- 21 January 2014: IPTL announced that one of the charter franchises for the league inaugural 2014 season would be in Bangkok.
- 2 March: The Bangkok franchise participated in the IPTL inaugural draft.
- 10 May: IPTL announced that the Bangkok franchise would move to Manila.
- 25 June: The Manila franchise is named the Manila Mavericks.
- 23 July: The Mavericks announced that their home matches would be played at Smart Araneta Coliseum in Quezon City, Metropolitan Manila.
- 23 July: The Mavericks announced that they had signed Maria Sharapova to replace the injured Victoria Azarenka.
- 23 July: The Mavericks announced that they had signed Treat Huey.
- 29 August: The Mavericks announced a change in their home venue from Smart Araneta Coliseum to Mall of Asia Arena in Pasay, Metropolitan Manila.
- 27 October: Treat Huey was named the Mavericks' first coach.
- 28 November: The Mavericks opened their inaugural season with a 29–24 loss at home to the UAE Royals.
- 30 November: The Mavericks earned their first victory in franchise history with a 27–19 home win over the Singapore Slammers.

== Match log ==
Legend
Mavericks Win	Mavericks Loss
Home team in CAPS (including coin-flip winners)

Match	Date	Venue and location	Result and details	Record
1	28 November	Mall of Asia Arena; Pasay, Metro Manila, Philippines	UAE Royals 29, MANILA MAVERICKS 24 * LS: Goran Ivanišević (Royals) 6, Carlos Moyá (Mavericks) 5 * MD: Marin Čilić/Nenad Zimonjić (Royals) 6, Treat Huey/Jo-Wilfried Tsonga (Mavericks) 4 * XD: Kristina Mladenovic/Nenad Zimonjić (Royals) 6, Maria Sharapova/Andy Murray (Mavericks) 4 * WS: Maria Sharapova (Mavericks) 6, Kristina Mladenovic (Royals) 5 * MS: Marin Čilić (Royals) 6, Andy Murray (Mavericks) 5	0–1
2	29 November	Mall of Asia Arena; Pasay, Metro Manila, Philippines	Indian Aces 24, MANILA MAVERICKS 15 * LS: Fabrice Santoro (Aces) 6, Daniel Nestor (Mavericks) 1; ***Daniel Nestor substituted for Carlos Moyá * MD: Treat Huey/Jo-Wilfried Tsonga (Mavericks) 6, Rohan Bopanna/Gaël Monfils (Aces) 0 * MS: Gaël Monfils (Aces) 6, Andy Murray (Mavericks) 4 * XD: Sania Mirza/Rohan Bopanna (Aces) 6, Maria Sharapova/Andy Murray (Mavericks) 1 * WS: Ana Ivanovic (Aces) 6, Maria Sharapova (Mavericks) 3	0–2
3	30 November	Mall of Asia Arena; Pasay, Metro Manila, Philippines	MANILA MAVERICKS 27, Singapore Slammers 19 * LS: Mark Philippoussis (Mavericks) 6, Patrick Rafter (Slammers) 2 * MD: Treat Huey/Jo-Wilfried Tsonga (Mavericks) 6, Tomáš Berdych/Nick Kyrgios (Slammers) 5; ***Nick Kyrgios substituted for Lleyton Hewitt * XD: Kirsten Flipkens/Andy Murray (Mavericks) 6, Serena Williams/Lleyton Hewitt (Slammers) 1 * WS: Serena Williams (Slammers) 6, Kirsten Flipkens (Mavericks) 3 * MS: Andy Murray (Mavericks) 6, Nick Kyrgios (Slammers) 5	1–2
4	2 December	Singapore Indoor Stadium; Singapore	Manila Mavericks 29 at SINGAPORE SLAMMERS 21 * LS: Mark Philippoussis (Mavericks) 6, Andre Agassi (Slammers) 3 * MD: Treat Huey/Jo-Wilfried Tsonga (Mavericks) 6, Lleyton Hewitt/Tomáš Berdych (Slammers) 4 * MS: Jo-Wilfred Tsonga (Mavericks) 6, Tomáš Berdych (Slammers) 5 * XD: Kirsten Flipkens/Daniel Nestor (Mavericks) 6, Serena Williams/Nick Kyrgios (Slammers) 3 * WS: Serena Williams (Slammers) 6, Kirsten Flipkens (Mavericks) 5	2–2
5	3 December	Singapore Indoor Stadium; Singapore	Manila Mavericks 21 vs. UAE Royals 26 * LS: Mark Philippoussis (Mavericks) 6, Goran Ivanišević (Royals) 5 * MS: Jo-Wilfried Tsonga (Mavericks) 4, Marin Čilić (Royals) 6 * MD: Jo-Wilfred Tsonga/Treat Huey (Mavericks) 6, Marin Čilić/Nenad Zimonjić (Royals) 3 * XD: Daniel Nestor/Kirsten Flipkens (Mavericks) 1, Nenad Zimonjić/Kristina Mladenovic (Royals) 6 * WS: Kirsten Flipkens (Mavericks) 4, Kristina Mladenovic (Royals) 6	2–3
6	4 December	Singapore Indoor Stadium; Singapore	Manila Mavericks 25 vs. Indian Aces 20 * LS: Mark Philippoussis (Mavericks) 6, Cedric Pioline (Aces)4 * WS: Kirsten Flipkens (Mavericks) 2, Ana Ivanovic (Aces) 6 * MXD: Daniel Nestor/Kirsten Flipkens (Mavericks) 6, Rohan Bopanna/Sania Mirza (Aces) 2 * MD: Treat Huey/Jo-Wilfried Tsonga (Mavericks) 6, Rohan Bopanna/Gael Monfils (Aces) 2 * MS: Jo-Wilfried Tsonga (Mavericks) 5, Gael Monfils (Aces) 6	3-3
7	6 December	Indira Gandhi Indoor Stadium; New Delhi, Delhi, India	Manila Mavericks 25 at INDIAN ACES 26 * MXD: Daniel Nestor/Kirsten Flipkens (Mavericks) 6, Rohan Bopanna/Sania Mirza (Aces) 5 * MLS: Mark Philippoussis (Mavericks) 6, Cedric Pioline (Aces) 4 * MD: Jo-Wilfried Tsonga/Treat Huey (Mavericks) 5, Gael Monfils/Rohan Bopanna (Aces) 6 * MS: Jo-Wilfried Tsonga (Mavericks) 6, Gael Monfils (Aces) 4 * Kirsten Flipkens (Mavericks) 2, Ana Ivanovic (Aces) 6 * SO: Jo-Wilfried Tsonga (Mavericks) 0, Gael Monfils (Aces) 1	3–4
8	7 December	Indira Gandhi Indoor Stadium; New Delhi, Delhi, India	Manila Mavericks 27 vs. UAE Royals 24 * MLS: Mark Philippoussis (Mavericks) 6, Goran Ivanisevic (Royals) 3 * MS: Jo-Wilfried Tsonga (Mavericks) 5, Marin Cilic (Royals) 6 * MD: Jo-Wilfried Tsonga/Daniel Nestor (Mavericks) 6, Nenad Zimonjic/Novak Djokovic (Royals) 5 * MXD: Daniel Nestor/Kirsten Flipkens (Mavericks) 6, Nenad Zimonjic/Kristina Mladenovic (Royals) 2 * WS: Kirsten Flipkens (Mavericks) 4, Caroline Wozniacki (Royals) 8	4-4
9	8 December	Indira Gandhi Indoor Stadium; New Delhi, Delhi, India	Manila Mavericks 23 vs. Singapore Slammers 17 * MS: Jo-Wilfried Tsonga (Mavericks) 6, Nick Kyrgios (Slammers) 2 * MXD: Daniel Nestor/Kirsten Flipkens (Mavericks) 3, Nick Kyrgios/Daniela Hantuchova (Slammers) 6 * WS: Kirsten Flipkens (Mavericks) 2, Daniela Hantuchova (Slammers) 6 * MD: Jo-Wilfried Tsonga/Daniel Nestor (Mavericks) 6, Nick Kyrgios/Lleyton Hewitt (Slammers) 0 * LS: Mark Philippoussis (Mavericks) 6, Patrick Rafter (Slammers) 3	5–4
10	11 December	Hamdan bin Mohammed bin Rashid Sports Complex; Dubai, United Arab Emirates	Manila Mavericks 25 at UAE ROYALS 26 * WS: Kisten Flipens (Mavericks) 2, Caroline Wozniacki (Royals) 6 * LS: Mark Philippoussis (Mavericks) 6, Goran Ivanisevic (Royals) 5 * MS: Jo-Wilfred Tsonga (Mavericks) 6, Novac Djokovic (Royals) 5 * MXD: Daniel Nestor/Kirsten Flipkens (Mavericks) 6, Nenad Zimonjić/Kristina Mladenovic (Royals) 4 * MD: Daniel Nestor/Jo-Wilfred Tsonga (Mavericks) 5, Nenad Zimonjić/Marin Čilić (Royals) 6	5-5
11	12 December	Hamdan bin Mohammed bin Rashid Sports Complex; Dubai, United Arab Emirates	Manila Mavericks 23 vs. Indian Aces 28 * LS: Mark Philippoussis (Mavericks) 3, Fabrice Santoro (Aces) 6 * MS: Jo-Wilfred Tsonga (Mavericks) 2, Gael Monfils (Aces) 6 * MXD: Daniel Nestor/Kirsten Flipkens (Mavericks) 4, Rohan Bopanna/Sania Mirza (Aces) 6 * WS: Kirsten Flipkens (Mavericks) 3, Ana Ivanovic (Aces) 6 * MD: Jo-Wilfred Tsonga/Daniel Nestor (Mavericks) 6, Rohan Bopanna/Gael Monfils (Aces) 3	5–6
12	13 December	Hamdan bin Mohammed bin Rashid Sports Complex; Dubai, United Arab Emirates	Manila Mavericks 30 vs. Singapore Slammers 15 * LS: Mark Philippoussis (Mavericks) 6, Patrick Rafter (Slammers) 5 * MS: Philipp Kohlschreiber (Mavericks) 6, Tomáš Berdych (Slammers) 2 * XD: Kirsten Flipkens/Daniel Nestor (Mavericks) 6, Daniela Hantuchová/Nick Kyrgios 1 * MD: Philipp Kohlschreiber/Daniel Nestor (Mavericks) 6, Lleyton Hewitt/Bruno Soares (Slammers) 4 * WS: Kirsten Flipkens (Mavericks) 6, Daniela Hantuchová (Slammers) 3	6-6

Key: MS = men's singles; MD = men's doubles; WS = women's singles; MXD = mixed doubles; LS = legends' singles; OT = overtime (additional games played in extended fifth sets); SO = men's singles super shoot-out

== Roster ==
- (Philippines) Treat Huey – Player-Coach
- (Belarus) Victoria Azarenka – injured, did not play
- (Belgium) Kirsten Flipkens
- (Spain) Carlos Moyá
- (United Kingdom) Andy Murray
- (Canada) Daniel Nestor
- (Russia) Maria Sharapova
- (France) Jo-Wilfried Tsonga

== Television coverage ==
Television coverage in the Philippines of Mavericks matches was provided by ABS-CBN.
