= 2015 International Premier Tennis League season =

2015 International Premier Tennis League
- League: International Premier Tennis League
- Sport: Team tennis
- Duration: 2–20 December 2015
- Teams: 5
- TV partner(s): (Philippines) Sports5 (United Arab Emirates) Abu Dhabi Media (United States) Integrated Sports Media (Canada) TSN-RDS (Japan) WOWOW (Singapore) SingTel (India) STAR Sports; ESPN Latin America (Brazil) ESPN Brasil
- League champions: Singapore Slammers
- Runners-up: Indian Aces

IPTL seasons
- ← 2014 2016 →

The 2015 International Premier Tennis League season (2015 IPTL season, officially the 2015 Coca-Cola International Premier Tennis League Presented by Qatar Airways season pursuant to sponsorship agreements with The Coca-Cola Company and Qatar Airways) is the second season of the professional team tennis league contested by five teams in Asia.

== Format ==
The teams compete in a customized round robin format of matches in each host country. The top two teams at the end of the round robin stage qualify for the final. The winner of the final is declared the champion.

In the 2015 season, the league has terminated the "last set importance" which gave the trailing team an opportunity to continue playing if they win the fifth set as played out in the 2014 season. In the 2015 season, the fifth set continues in the conventional way, where the first team to score 6 games wins the set, with a 13-point tie-breaker to decide the winner, if the two teams are tied at 5–5.

If the two teams are tied (in terms of games won) at the end of the five Sets, a super shoot-out is played in a men's singles format to determine the winner of the match. It is played as a 19-point super tiebreaker. The first team to win 10 points, 9–9 final point wins the Super Shoot-Out and hence the Match. A 2-point difference is not required, and it is not time bound (unlike the 2014 season). The match-winner is the team that wins the most games and hence points, at the end of the five sets.

The league standings are determined on the basis of the win–loss percentage of overall games won versus lost therefore making every game played count. The two teams with the best percentage ratios qualify for the finals. In the event that two teams are tied for the second place, the following criteria determines which team qualifies for the finals:

- head-to-head results
- largest winning margin, by games, in any single match
- coin toss

== Teams ==
Five teams will compete in the 2015 IPTL season. Japan Warriors is set to become the fifth team to participate at the IPTL.

- (India) Indian Aces
- (Philippines) Philippine Mavericks
- Singapore Slammers
- (United Arab Emirates) UAE Royals
- Japan Warriors

=== Draft results ===
Novak Djokovic pulled out of the tournament and was replaced by Andy Murray and Stan Wawrinka by Singapore Slammers. Dustin Brown replaced Thanasi Kokkinakis. Milos Raonic replaced Borna Ćorić. Édouard Roger-Vasselin replaced Jo-Wilfried Tsonga. Philipp Kohlschreiber replaced Vasek Pospisil. Pierre-Hugues Herbert replaced Lucas Pouille. Mirjana Lučić-Baroni replaced Daniela Hantuchová. Alja Tomljanović replaced Sabine Lisicki.

Category	Philippine Mavericks	UAE Royals	Indian Aces	Singapore Slammers	Japan Warriors
Men
Icon players		(Switzerland) Roger Federer	(Spain) Rafael Nadal	(United Kingdom) Andy Murray	
Category A	(Canada) Milos Raonic	(Czech Republic) Tomáš Berdych	(Australia) Bernard Tomic	(Switzerland) Stan Wawrinka	(Japan) Kei Nishikori
Category B	(France) Richard Gasquet	(Croatia) Marin Čilić	(France) Gaël Monfils		
Category C	(Croatia) Ivo Karlović			(Australia) Nick Kyrgios	(Germany) Philipp Kohlschreiber
Category D	(France) Edouard Roger-Vasselin		(Croatia) Ivan Dodig		
Legends	(Australia) Mark Philippoussis (United States) James Blake	(Croatia) Goran Ivanišević	(France) Fabrice Santoro	(Spain) Carlos Moyá	(Russia) Marat Safin (Sweden) Thomas Enqvist
Doubles players	(Philippines) Treat Huey	(Canada) Daniel Nestor	(India) Rohan Bopanna	(Brazil) Marcelo Melo	(India) Leander Paes
Uncategorized	(India) Somdev Devvarman			(Germany) Dustin Brown	(France) Pierre-Hugues Herbert
Women
Icon players	(United States) Serena Williams				(Russia) Maria Sharapova
Category A		(Serbia) Ana Ivanovic	(Poland) Agnieszka Radwańska		
Category B			(Australia) Samantha Stosur	(Switzerland) Belinda Bencic	(Croatia) Mirjana Lučić-Baroni
Category C	(Australia) Ajla Tomljanović	(France) Kristina Mladenovic	(Russia) Svetlana Kuznetsova	(Czech Republic) Karolína Plíšková	
Category D	(Australia) Jarmila Gajdošová		(India) Sania Mirza		(Belgium) Kirsten Flipkens
Uncategorized					(Japan) Kurumi Nara

== Calendar ==
Round	Date	Location	Stadium	Capacity
1	December 2–4	(Japan) Kobe	Kobe World Hall	8,000
2	December 6–8	(Philippines) Manila	Mall of Asia Arena	20,000
3	December 10–12	(India) New Delhi	Indira Gandhi Indoor Stadium	14,348
4	December 14–16	(United Arab Emirates) Dubai	Aviation Club Tennis Centre	8,000
5	December 18–20	Singapore	Singapore Indoor Stadium	12,000

== Results ==
Round	Location	Date	Team 1	Score	Team 2
1	(Japan) Kobe	2 December	UAE Royals	26–20	Singapore Slammers
1	(Japan) Kobe	2 December	Japan Warriors	24–25	Indian Aces
1	(Japan) Kobe	3 December	Philippine Mavericks	24–26	Singapore Slammers
1	(Japan) Kobe	3 December	Japan Warriors	15–30	UAE Royals
1	(Japan) Kobe	4 December	Singapore Slammers	22–27	Indian Aces
1	(Japan) Kobe	4 December	Japan Warriors	24–28	Philippine Mavericks
2	(Philippines) Manila	6 December	Japan Warriors	20–29	Singapore Slammers
2	(Philippines) Manila	6 December	UAE Royals	18–29	Philippine Mavericks
2	(Philippines) Manila	7 December	Indian Aces	30–18	UAE Royals
2	(Philippines) Manila	7 December	Japan Warriors	21–25	Philippine Mavericks
2	(Philippines) Manila	8 December	Singapore Slammers	23–26	UAE Royals
2	(Philippines) Manila	8 December	Indian Aces	24–25	Philippine Mavericks
3	(India) New Delhi	10 December	Japan Warriors	24–21	UAE Royals
3	(India) New Delhi	10 December	Philippine Mavericks	12–30	Indian Aces
3	(India) New Delhi	11 December	Singapore Slammers	30–23	Philippine Mavericks
3	(India) New Delhi	11 December	Japan Warriors	21–26	Indian Aces
3	(India) New Delhi	12 December	Japan Warriors	22–24	Singapore Slammers
3	(India) New Delhi	12 December	UAE Royals	19–30	Indian Aces
4	(United Arab Emirates) Dubai	14 December	Indian Aces	25–18	Japan Warriors
4	(United Arab Emirates) Dubai	14 December	UAE Royals	24–26	Philippine Mavericks
4	(United Arab Emirates) Dubai	15 December	Indian Aces	24–23	Philippine Mavericks
4	(United Arab Emirates) Dubai	15 December	Singapore Slammers	27–24	UAE Royals
4	(United Arab Emirates) Dubai	16 December	Indian Aces	16–27	Singapore Slammers
4	(United Arab Emirates) Dubai	16 December	Japan Warriors	22–26	UAE Royals
5	Singapore	18 December	Japan Warriors	29–15	Philippine Mavericks
5	Singapore	18 December	UAE Royals	27–23	Singapore Slammers
5	Singapore	19 December	UAE Royals	23–24	Philippine Mavericks
5	Singapore	19 December	Indian Aces	21–27	Singapore Slammers
5	Singapore	20 December Final	Singapore Slammers	26–21	Indian Aces

== Results table ==
Abbreviation and Color Key: Indian Aces (IND) • Philippine Mavericks (PHI) • Singapore Slammers (SIN) • UAE Royals (UAE) • Japan Warriors (JAP) Win • Loss • Home • Away • Neutral
Team	Match														
Team	1	2	3	4	5	6	7	8	9	10	11	12	13	14	15
Team	Dec 2	Dec 3	Dec 4	Dec 6	Dec 7	Dec 8	Dec 10	Dec 11	Dec 12	Dec 14	Dec 15	Dec 16	Dec 18	Dec 19	Dec 20
(India) Indian Aces (2015 season)	JAP	free day	SIN	free day	UAE	PHI	PHI	JAP	UAE	JAP	PHI	SIN	free day	SIN	SIN
(India) Indian Aces (2015 season)	25–24	free day	27–22	free day	30–18	24–25	30–12	26–21	30–19	25–18	24–23	16–27	free day	21–27	21–26
(Philippines) Philippine Mavericks (2015 season)	free day	SIN	JAP	UAE	JAP	IND	IND	SIN	free day	UAE	IND	free day	JAP	UAE	4th
(Philippines) Philippine Mavericks (2015 season)	free day	24–26	28–24	29–18	25–21	25–24	12–30	22–30	free day	26–24	23–24	free day	15–29	24–23	4th
Singapore Slammers (2015 season)	UAE	PHI	IND	JAP	free day	UAE	free day	PHI	JAP	free day	UAE	IND	UAE	IND	IND
Singapore Slammers (2015 season)	20–26	26–24	22–27	29–20	free day	23–26	free day	30–22	24–22	free day	27–24	27–16	23–27	27–21	26–21
(United Arab Emirates) UAE Royals (2015 season)	SIN	JAP	free day	~~PHI~~^{[1]}	IND	SIN	JAP	free day	IND	PHI	SIN	JAP	SIN	PHI	3rd
(United Arab Emirates) UAE Royals (2015 season)	26–20	30–15	free day	18–29	18–30	26–23	21–24	free day	19–30	24–26	24–27	26–22	27–23	23–24	3rd
Japan Warriors (2015 season)	IND	UAE	PHI	SIN	PHI	free day	UAE	IND	SIN	IND	free day	UAE	PHI	free day	5th
Japan Warriors (2015 season)	24–25	15–30	24–28	20–29	21–25	free day	24–21	21–26	22–24	18–25	free day	22–26	29–15	free day	5th

Notes

- ^{^{1}} Due to the odd number of teams through this Season, one team plays an extra match. That team will be allowed to drop their score on any one match through the Season provided they inform this intent soon after the match is completed. This Season, the team that plays the extra match is the Obi UAE Royals. The Obi UAE Royals have chosen to drop their score on the match played against the Philippine Mavericks on December 6, 2015 in Manila. The score for the Philippine Mavericks however does count towards their Win Percentage.

== Standings ==
Standings are determined by percentage of games won. Top two teams qualify for final.

P	Team	MP	W	L	GW	GL	G%
1	(India) Indian Aces	11	8	3	278	236	54.09%
2	Singapore Slammers	11	7	4	278	255	52.16%
3	(United Arab Emirates) UAE Royals	11	5	6	264	264	50%
4	(Philippines) Philippine Mavericks	11	6	5	253	273	48.1%
5	Japan Warriors	11	2	9	240	274	46.69%

=== Position summary ===
The following table shows the day-by-day position of each team in the league standings.

Team	D1	D2	D3	D4	D5	D6	D7	D8	D9	D10	D11	D12	D13	D14	D15/Final
(Philippines) Philippine Mavericks	X	4	3	1	2	1	2	4	4	4	3	4	4	4	X
(United Arab Emirates) UAE Royals	1	1	1	2	3	3	3	3	3	3	4	3	3	3	X
(India) Indian Aces	2	2	2	3	1	2	1	1	1	1	1	1	1	1	2
Japan Warriors	3	5	5	5	5	5	5	5	5	5	5	5	5	5	X
Singapore Slammers	4	3	4	4	4	4	4	2	2	2	2	2	2	2	1

== Teams head-to-head ==
2015 International Premier Tennis League season

#	Team	Ind. Aces	Mavericks	Slammers	Royals	Warriors	2015 season	All seasons
1	(India) Indian Aces		2–1	1–2	2–0	3–0	8–3	16–7
2	(Philippines) Philippine Mavericks	1–2		0–2	3–0	2–1	6–5	12–11
3	Singapore Slammers	2–1	2–0		1–3	2–0	7–4	10–13
4	(United Arab Emirates) UAE Royals	0–2	0–2	3–1		2–1	5–6	12–11
5	Japan Warriors	0–3	1–2	0–2	1–2		2–9	First season

== Final ==
The final was held at the Singapore Indoor Stadium on 20 December In Singapore.

After an 18-day 5-nation tour the Indian Aces, with 8 eight wins out of 11 this season, and the Singapore Slammers, last on the league table in first edition, but finishing a strong second this season, played the final of a prize money of USD 1 million (USD 500,000 for the runners-up), which was won by the Slammers 26-21.

The Most Valuable Player (MVP) (Male) for IPTL 2015 was Ivan Dodig (Aces) whilst Belinda Bencic (Slammers) was adjudged the MVP (Female) for their performances through the season.

Final
All Matches
Event	Singapore Slammers	Indian Aces	Score	Score after set
Legends' Singles	(Spain) Carlos Moyá	(France) Fabrice Santoro	6–4	6–4
Women's Singles	(Switzerland) Belinda Bencic	(Russia) Svetlana Kuznetsova	6–5^{(7–3)}	12–9
Mixed Doubles	(Germany) Dustin Brown (Czech Republic) Karolína Plíšková	(India) Sania Mirza (India) Rohan Bopanna	2–6	14–15
Men's Singles	(Switzerland) Stanislas Wawrinka	(Australia) Bernard Tomic	6–3	20–18
Men's Doubles	(Brazil) Marcelo Melo (Switzerland) Stanislas Wawrinka	(India) Rohan Bopanna (Croatia) Ivan Dodig	6–3	26–21
Final score
Total score	Singapore Slammers	Indian Aces	26–21	
