= 2015 in Indian sport =

In 2015, the Indian national cricket team reached the semifinal of the 2015 Cricket World Cup where Virat Kohli and Ravichandran Ashwin plays a massive role.

== Cricket World Cup Australia/New Zealand ==
India participated in ICC Cricket World Cup 2015 hosted by Australia and New Zealand.

Date	Opposition	Result	Stage
15 Feb	Pakistan	won by 76 runs	Group
22 Feb	South Africa	won by 130 runs	Group
28 Feb	United Arab Emirates	won by 9 wickets	Group
06 Mar	West Indies	won by 4 wickets	Group
10 Mar	Ireland	won by 8 wickets	Group
14 Mar	Zimbabwe	won by 6 wickets	Group
19 Mar	Bangladesh	won by 109 runs	Quarter Final
26 Mar	Australia	lost by 95 runs	Semi Final

- Interesting facts about India:

1. India beat Pakistan for the sixth time in row in ICC Cricket World Cup and maintained winning streak by taking 6–0 lead which started from 1992 Cricket World Cup. Till this edition of Men's ODI World Cup Pakistan has never beaten India in ICC Cricket World Cup.
2. After losing three times (1992, 1999, 2011) against South Africa, India finally got a win against South Africa in ICC Cricket World Cup.
3. India bowled out the opposition in all the game that India won but were all out when the team lost to Australia.
4. India was unbeaten until the defeat against Australia in semis.

Team 1	Agg.	Team 2	1st leg	2nd leg
India	2–0	Nepal	2–0	0–0

12 March 2015
19:00 UTC+5:30

India	2–0	Nepal
Chhetri 53', 71'	Report (FIFA); Report (AFC)

Indira Gandhi Athletic Stadium, Guwahati
Attendance: 11,200
Referee: Aziz Asimov (Uzbekistan)
17 March 2015
15:30 UTC+5:45

Nepal	0–0	India
	Report (FIFA); Report (AFC)

Dasarath Rangasala Stadium, Kathmandu
Attendance: 10,500
Referee: Khamis Al-Marri (Qatar)

India won 2–0 on aggregate and advanced to the second round.

=== Second round ===
- Draws were taken out on 14 April 2015 and matches began on 11 June 2015. There were forty teams divided in eight groups of five teams each, with India assigned to Group D. Of the six matches played by India during 2015, India won 1 and lost 5.

== Events ==
=== January ===
- 28 December-14 – 11 January-15: Matches of XXXVI Indian Federation Cup will be scheduled.
- 5 January - 11 January: Chennai Open is scheduled.

XXXVI Indian Federation Cup Final scheduled at Jawaharlal Nehru, Madgaon.

- 20 January - 25 January: II Indian Open Grand Prix Gold is scheduled at Babu Banarasi Das Indoor Stadium in Lucknow.
- 17 January: VIII I-League season begins.
- 22 January: III HIL season will begin.
- 31 January - 14 February: XXXV National Games will be held in Thiruvananthapuram in Kerala.

=== February ===
- 22 February: III HIL season final. Hero HIL ended. Ranchi Rays won the final by beating Jaypee Punjab Warriors in 3-2 penalty shootout after score were leveled 2-2.

=== March ===
- 10 March - 14 March: 2015 Indian Open Snooker is scheduled in Grand Hyatt Hotel, Mumbai. Michael White of Wales was the winner.
- 12 March: 80th Ranji Trophy season will end. India beat Nepal 2–0 in the first leg of AFC FIFA World Cup Qualification for 2018 FIFA World Cup, Russia.
- 17 March: Second leg of AFC FIFA World Cup Qualification was drawn 0-0 played between India and Nepal

=== April ===
- 8 April: VIII IPL season will begin.

=== May ===
- 18 May: VIII I-League season end.
- 24 May: VIII IPL season final. Pepsi IPL season ends.

=== September ===
- II ISL will kick off.
- Ten Pin Bowling League will be held.

=== December ===
- II ISL will end.

=== Unknown ===
- Indian Open Golf may take place.
- 2015 FIBA Asia Under-16 Championship is scheduled in Bangalore.
- XI SAFF Championship will take place in September or December.

== Major National Leagues ==
Game	Duration		League	Season	Winner	Notes
Game	Start	End	League	Season	Winner	Notes
Football	17 January	May	I-League	8th season		Eighth season of India's premier football tournament.
Hockey	22 January	22 February	Hockey India League (HIL)	3rd season	Ranchi Rays (First title)	After Ranchi Rhinos won the first title, this is the second time a Ranchi team won the HIL title. Out of three champions two are from Ranchi.
Twenty20	8 April	24 May	Indian Premier League (IPL)	8th season		Eighth season of India's main sport tournament.
Football	September	December	Indian Super League (ISL)	2nd season		Second season of India's IPL Style football tournament.
Tennis	TBA		International Premier Tennis League (ITPL)	2 ^{nd} season		Second season of Asian tennis league. Micromax Indian Aces will represent India. A new team from Japan will be introduced, Japan Warriors.

Uncertain to take place

- Champions Tennis League - Second season may take place.
- Indian Badminton League - Second season may take place in June.
- Pro Kabaddi League - Second season may take place in July.
- World Kabaddi League - Second season may take place.
