= 2014 International Premier Tennis League season =

2014 International Premier Tennis League season Inaugural season
- League: International Premier Tennis League
- Sport: Team tennis
- Duration: 28 November–13 December 2014
- Teams: 4
- TV partner(s): (Philippines) ABS-CBN (United Arab Emirates) Abu Dhabi Media (United States) Integrated Sports Media (Singapore) SingTel (India) STAR Sports
- League champions: Indian Aces
- Runners-up: UAE Royals

IPTL seasons
- 2015 →

The 2014 International Premier Tennis League season (2014 IPTL season, officially the 2014 Coca-Cola International Premier Tennis League Presented by Qatar Airways season pursuant to sponsorship agreements with The Coca-Cola Company and Qatar Airways) is the inaugural season of the professional team tennis league contested by four teams in Asia.

== Competition format ==
Four teams will compete for the IPTL Challenge Trophy and a US$1 million grand prize by earning the most points in the team standings. A team that wins a match tie is awarded four points. A team that loses a match tie but wins at least 20 games in the match earns two points. A team that loses a match tie but wins at least 10 games earns one point. Each team will play 12 matches: three at home, three on the road and six at neutral sites. Each match comprises five sets each of a different category as follows:

- Men's singles
- Women's singles
- Men's doubles
- Mixed doubles
- Past champions' singles

The order of play is decided by the coach of the home team. If two teams are playing at a neutral site, then a coin toss determines which coach chooses the order of play. The first serve in the first set is determined by a coin toss. The team that served last in the last game or tiebreaker of the previous set will receive during the next set.

Each team can call a power point once in each set when receiving serve, and the next point played will count double. Effectively, a player trailing 15–0 can directly get to 15–30 by winning the power point.

Games are played to four points using no-ad scoring. Each game won by a player or doubles team adds one point to the team's score in the match. The team with the most points at the end of the five sets wins the match. Each set is won when a team is the first to reach six games won. If the score is five-games-all, a timed five-minute shoot-out will be played. The player or doubles team leading at the end of five minutes wins the set.

If the team that wins the fifth set is leading the match, the match is over. If the score is tied after one team has won the fifth set, a timed seven-minute men's singles super shoot-out is played. The result counts as a game point won. If the team that wins the fifth set is trailing in the match, the match will go to sudden-death overtime effectively extending the fifth set. If the leading team wins one game in overtime, it wins the match tie. If the trailing team wins enough games in overtime to tie the score without losing a game, a timed seven-minute men's singles super shoot-out is played to decide the winner of the match tie. A coin toss decides who serves first in the super shoot-out.

In the event that two or more teams share the highest points on the final tally, the criteria to decide the champion are

1. Head-to-head results
2. Number of games won
3. Number of games lost
4. Biggest games margin in any single match win
5. Coin toss

== Founding of the league and charter franchises ==
Mahesh Bhupathi announced the founding of the International Premier Tennis League on 25 May 2013, in Paris. The initial plan was to start the league with six charter franchises in Asia with the inaugural season commencing in November 2014.

On 21 January 2014, IPTL announced the locations of the six charter franchises for the league's inaugural season. Five franchises would play their home matches in Bangkok, Hong Kong, Kuala Lumpur, Mumbai and Singapore. A sixth franchise would play its home matches in an undisclosed city in the Middle East. There was confusion surrounding the announcement. Some media outlets reported that there would be five franchises, not six as had been previously announced, and did not include the Hong Kong franchise among the five. Later news reports in February 2014, indicated that there would be five franchises including one based in Hong Kong but not one in the Middle East.

IPTL conducted its inaugural player draft on 2 March. Right up until the day before the draft, the media remained under the impression that the Hong Kong and Kuala Lumpur franchises would participate in the league and that the Middle East franchise was doubtful. However, only four teams participated in the draft: Bangkok, Mumbai, Singapore and Middle East now referred to as the Dubai franchise. No mention was made by IPTL of the Hong Kong and Kuala Lumpur franchises which had abruptly disappeared.

By May, the Dubai franchise was being referred to as the UAE Falcons, the Mumbai franchise had been named the Indian Aces, and the Singapore franchise was being referred to as the Singapore Lions.

On 10 May, IPTL announced that the Bangkok franchise would be moved to Manila, Philippines due to political unrest in Thailand.

On 19 June, an IPTL press release revealed the owners of the four franchises to the general public. The owner of the Indian franchise, Micromax Informatics Ltd. proved to be the reason the team was no longer called the Mumbai franchise, because it preferred to have the team play its home matches in New Delhi. A group called PVP Ventures led by entrepreneur Prasad V Potluri (Telugu: ప్రసాద్ వి పొట్లూరి) and cricket legend Sachin Tendulkar had been the original franchise owners with a plan to play home matches in Mumbai. While league managing director Bhupathi said PVP Ventures had been replaced by Micromax, because PVP missed a payment deadline, PVP said it had withdrawn from the league due to lack of clarity over how IPTL's business model was progressing and disagreements over player contracts. PVP did not want the team to be solely responsible for payment of player salaries and favored the league being obligated as well.

By June, the Manila franchise had been named the Manila Mavericks, the Falcons had become the UAE Royals and the Lions had become the Singapore Slammers.

=== Summary of the evolution of the charter franchise names ===
- Bangkok → Manila → Manila Mavericks
- Hong Kong → franchise abandoned
- Kuala Lumpur → franchise abandoned
- Middle East → Dubai → UAE Falcons → UAE Royals
- Mumbai → India → Indian Aces
- Singapore → Singapore Lions → Singapore Slammers

== Inaugural draft ==
For the inaugural draft, each team was subject to a salary cap of US$10 million. Players who had expressed a willingness to participate were selected by the league and placed into categories. Teams could bid on these players with the player signing with the highest bidder in an auction-style format. Bids would be taken on 28 players in which the teams expressed interest in signing including players not categorized by IPTL. Each team participating in the draft was required to sign at least six players and could not sign more than ten.

=== Players by category ===
Players were placed into the following categories:

Men

Category	Player
Icon players	(United States) Andre Agassi
Icon players	(Serbia) Novak Djokovic
Icon players	(Switzerland) Roger Federer
Icon players	(United Kingdom) Andy Murray
Icon players	(United States) Pete Sampras
Icon players	(Switzerland) Stan Wawrinka
Category A	(Czech Republic) Tomáš Berdych
Category A	(Spain) David Ferrer
Category A	(France) Jo-Wilfried Tsonga
Category B	(France) Richard Gasquet
Category B	(Germany) Tommy Haas
Category B	(Australia) Lleyton Hewitt
Category B	(United States) John Isner
Category B	(France) Gaël Monfils
Category B	(Canada) Milos Raonic
Category C	(Cyprus) Marcos Baghdatis
Category C	(Ukraine) Alexandr Dolgopolov
Category C	(Italy) Fabio Fognini
Category C	(Poland) Jerzy Janowicz
Category C	(Germany) Philipp Kohlschreiber
Category C	(Spain) Feliciano López
Category C	(Spain) Fernando Verdasco
Category D	(South Africa) Kevin Anderson
Category D	(India) Somdev Devvarman
Category D	(Taiwan) Lu Yen-hsun
Category D	(Australia) Marinko Matošević
Category D	(United States) Sam Querrey
Category D	(Serbia) Janko Tipsarević
Category D	(Russia) Dmitry Tursunov
Past champions	(United States) Michael Chang
Past champions	(Spain) Juan Carlos Ferrero
Past champions	(Croatia) Goran Ivanišević
Past champions	(Spain) Carlos Moyá
Past champions	(Australia) Mark Philippoussis
Past champions	(Australia) Patrick Rafter
Past champions	(France) Fabrice Santoro
Past champions	(Germany) Rainer Schüttler
Doubles players	(India) Rohan Bopanna
Doubles players	(Poland) Mariusz Fyrstenberg
Doubles players	(Sweden) Robert Lindstedt
Doubles players	(Spain) Marc López
Doubles players	(Poland) Marcin Matkowski
Doubles players	(Brazil) Marcelo Melo
Doubles players	(Canada) Daniel Nestor
Doubles players	(Austria) Alexander Peya
Doubles players	(Pakistan) Aisam-ul-Haq Qureshi
Doubles players	(Brazil) Bruno Soares
Doubles players	(Serbia) Nenad Zimonjić

Women

Category	Player
Icon players	(Russia) Maria Sharapova
Icon players	(United States) Serena Williams
Icon players	(Denmark) Caroline Wozniacki
Category A	(Poland) Agnieszka Radwańska
Category B	(Serbia) Ana Ivanovic
Category B	(United States) Sloane Stephens
Category B	(Australia) Samantha Stosur
Category C	(Italy) Sara Errani
Category C	(Slovakia) Daniela Hantuchová
Category C	(Switzerland) Martina Hingis
Category C	(Serbia) Jelena Janković
Category C	(Germany) Angelique Kerber
Category C	(Russia) Svetlana Kuznetsova
Category D	(France) Alizé Cornet
Category D	(Belgium) Kirsten Flipkens
Category D	(Taiwan) Hsieh Su-wei
Category D	(Germany) Sabine Lisicki
Category D	(France) Kristina Mladenovic
Category D	(India) Sania Mirza
Category D	(Italy) Flavia Pennetta
Category D	(Italy) Francesca Schiavone
Category D	(Croatia) Donna Vekić

=== Draft results ===
Four charter franchises (Bangkok, Dubai, Indian Aces and Singapore) participated in the draft held in Dubai, United Arab Emirates, on 2 March 2014.

Category	Bangkok	Dubai	Indian Aces	Singapore
Men
Icon players	(United Kingdom) Andy Murray	(Serbia) Novak Djokovic	(Spain) Rafael Nadal (Note: Nadal was injured and did not play. He was replaced on the Aces roster by Roger Federer.)	(United States) Andre Agassi
Icon players			(United States) Pete Sampras	
Category A	(France) Jo-Wilfried Tsonga			(Czech Republic) Tomáš Berdych
Category B			(France) Gaël Monfils	(Australia) Lleyton Hewitt
Category C				
Category D		(Serbia) Janko Tipsarević		
Past champions	(Spain) Carlos Moyá	(Croatia) Goran Ivanišević	(France) Fabrice Santoro	(Australia) Patrick Rafter
Doubles players	(Canada) Daniel Nestor	(Serbia) Nenad Zimonjić	(India) Rohan Bopanna	(Brazil) Bruno Soares
Uncategorized		(Tunisia) Malek Jaziri		(Australia) Nick Kyrgios
Women
Icon players	(Russia) Maria Sharapova	(Denmark) Caroline Wozniacki		(United States) Serena Williams
Category A				
Category B			(Serbia) Ana Ivanovic	
Category C		(Switzerland) Martina Hingis		(Slovakia) Daniela Hantuchová
Category D	(Belgium) Kirsten Flipkens		(India) Sania Mirza	

== Event chronology ==
- 25 May 2013: Mahesh Bhupathi announced the formation of the International Premier Tennis League (IPTL) with the inaugural season commencing in November 2014.
- 21 January 2014: IPTL announced the six charter franchises will be based in Bangkok, Hong Kong, Kuala Lumpur, Mumbai, Singapore and an undisclosed city in the Middle East.
- 2 March: IPTL conducted its inaugural player draft. The Bangkok, Mumbai, Singapore and Middle East (now referred to as Dubai) franchises participated. No mention was made by IPTL of previously announced Hong Kong and Kuala Lumpur franchises which abruptly disappeared.
- 10 May: The Dubai franchise is referred to as the UAE Falcons. The Mumbai franchise is named the Indian Aces. The Singapore franchise is referred to as the Singapore Lions.
- 10 May: IPTL announced that the Bangkok franchise has moved to Manila, Philippines.
- 19 June: With the announcement of the franchise owners, it is revealed that Micromax has replaced PVP Ventures as the owner of the Indian Aces, and the team will play its home matches in New Delhi, not in Mumbai as had been originally planned.
- 25 June: The Manila franchise was named the Manila Mavericks. The Singapore Lions had their name changed to the Singapore Slammers. The UAE Falcons had their name changed to the UAE Royals.
- 22 September: The Aces announced that Rafael Nadal will not play due to an injury. As a replacement, the Aces signed Roger Federer.
- 28 November: The Indian Aces defeated the Singapore Slammers, 26–16, in the first match in IPTL history. Rohan Bopanna served the first point of the league's inaugural match.
- 30 November: The Indian Aces defeated the UAE Royals, 28–20, in a matchup of two previously unbeaten teams. The Aces improved their record to 3 wins and 0 losses and moved into first place in the league standings.
- 13 December: The Indian Aces are season champions after finishing with 8 wins and 4 losses and 39 points overall. The UAE Royals finish second, the Manila Mavericks finish third and the Singapore Slammers end in last place.

== Results table ==
Abbreviation and Color Key: Indian Aces (IND) • Manila Mavericks (MAN) • Singapore Slammers (SIN) • UAE Royals (UAE) Win • Loss • Home • Away • Neutral
Team	Match											
Team	1	2	3	4	5	6	7	8	9	10	11	12
Team	Nov 28	Nov 29	Nov 30	Dec 2	Dec 3	Dec 4	Dec 6	Dec 7	Dec 8	Dec 11	Dec 12	Dec 13
(India) Indian Aces (2014 season)	SIN	MAN	UAE	UAE	SIN	MAN	MAN	SIN	UAE	SIN	MAN	UAE
(India) Indian Aces (2014 season)	26–16	24–15	28–20	30–11	23–24	20–25	26–25	26–16	22–29	28–24	28–13	15–29
(Philippines) Manila Mavericks (2014 season)	UAE	IND	SIN	SIN	UAE	IND	IND	UAE	SIN	UAE	IND	SIN
(Philippines) Manila Mavericks (2014 season)	24–29	15–24	27–19	29–21	21–26	25–20	25-26	27–24	23–17	25–26	23–28	30–15
Singapore Slammers (2014 season)	IND	UAE	MAN	MAN	IND	UAE	UAE	IND	MAN	IND	UAE	MAN
Singapore Slammers (2014 season)	16–26	22–28	19–27	21–29	24–23	27–25	16–29	16–26	17–23	24–28	23–21	15–30
(United Arab Emirates) UAE Royals (2014 season)	MAN	SIN	IND	IND	MAN	SIN	SIN	MAN	IND	MAN	SIN	IND
(United Arab Emirates) UAE Royals (2014 season)	29–24	28–22	20–28	11–30	26–21	25–27	29–16	24–27	29–22	26–25	21–23	29–15

== Standings ==
Standings are determined by points with four points awarded for each match won, two points awarded for each match lost in which te team won 20 or more games and one point awarded for each match lost in which the team won between 10 and 19 games. In case of a tie in point, teams are placed by games won percentage.

P	Team	MP	W	L	L20	L10	Pts	GW	GL	G%
1	(India) Indian Aces	12	8	4	3	1	39	296	246	54.6%
2	(United Arab Emirates) UAE Royals	12	7	5	4	1	37	295	279	51.4%
3	(Philippines) Manila Mavericks	12	6	6	5	1	35	293	273	51.7%
4	Singapore Slammers	12	3	9	3	6	24	240	315	43.2%

=== Position summary ===
The following table shows the day-by-day position of each team in the league standings.

Team	D1	D2	D3	D4	D5	D6	D7	D8	D9	D10	D11	D12
(India) Indian Aces	2	2	1	1	1	1	1	1	1	1	1	1
(United Arab Emirates) UAE Royals	1	1	2	2	2	3	2	3	2	2	2	2
(Philippines) Manila Mavericks	3	3	3	3	3	2	3	2	3	3	3	3
Singapore Slammers	4	4	4	4	4	4	4	4	4	4	4	4

== Television coverage ==
On 22 August 2014, IPTL announced it had reached an agreement for the Middle East and North Africa television broadcasting rights with Abu Dhabi Media. On 16 October 2014, IPTL announced that STAR Sports would broadcast the league's matches live in both standard definition and high definition in India during its inaugural 2014 season. The league's matches will also be available live on STAR Sports's website. On 4 November 2014, Integrated Sports Media announced it had reached a deal with IPTL to televise every league match of the 2014 season on a pay-per-view basis in the United States. On 7 November 2014, IPTL announced it had reached agreements on television broadcast contracts with ABS-CBN in the Philippines and SingTel in Singapore. ABS-CBN will telecast the matches in the Philippines on the ABS-CBN Sports+Action and Balls channels.

The league also said there would be television coverage of its matches in the United Kingdom, France, the Czech Republic, Serbia, Southeast Asia, Sub-Saharan Africa and Brazil. In total, television coverage of IPTL matches will be available in more than 125 countries worldwide and reach over 300 million households.

== Sponsorship ==
On 3 November 2014, IPTL announced that The Coca-Cola Company had become the league's title sponsor.

On 26 November 2014, IPTL announced that Qatar Airways had become the league's presenting sponsor.

== Result ==
The 1st season of IPTL was won by the Micromax Indian Aces with the runners-up being the Musafir.com UAE Royals.
