= Odisha Tennis Premier League =

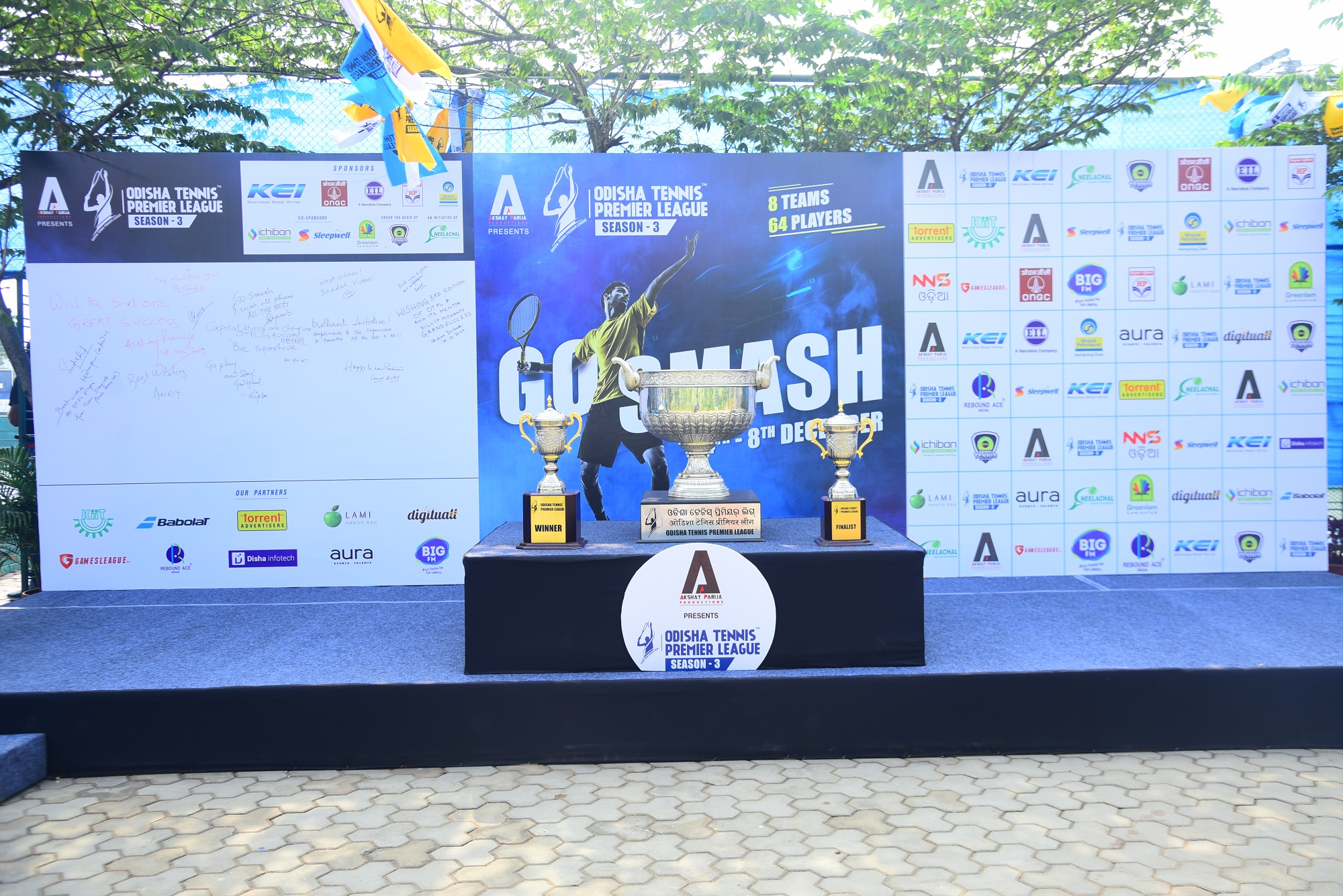
- Sport: Tennis
- Founded: 2017
- Founder: Dilip Mohanty
- No. of teams: 6
- Countries: India
- Continent: Asia
- Most recent champion: Capital Kings (2019)
- Most titles: Kendrapara Contenders (2017 & 2018)

Odisha Tennis Premier League is an International Professional Tennis League started in 2017 with zeal not only to promote this world sport but also to give wings to many young tennis players of India. Six Teams formed with ATP, WTA, and ITF players from different parts of India battled it out to lift the trophy. This league is supported by the International Tennis Federation and All India Tennis Association. Odisha Tennis Premier League is the brainchild of Shri Dilip Mohanty, CEO of Neelachal Sports Foundation. The foundation has introduced a new model in the country by introducing the concept of organizing Odisha Tennis Premier League - Biggest Tennis League of India so far.

== History ==
Hon’ble Chief Minister of Odisha Shri Naveen Patnaik and Hon’ble Minister of Petroleum & Natural Gas Shri Dharmendra Pradhan unveiled the Logo and Team T-shirt of Odisha Tennis Premier League on 18 August 2017 in New Delhi.

Odisha Tennis Premier League Trophy Unveiling Ceremony was held at Hotel Ashoka, New Delhi on 5 December 2018 for Season-2. Dignitaries were present for the ceremony are Shri Amarendra Khatua, Director General (ICCR) and former Ambassador to various countries, Shri Nishanta Bordoloi, Indian Cricketer, Mrs Richa Anirudh, prominent media personality and philanthropist, Shri Aditya Khanna, Member of Seniors Committee of All India Tennis Association (AITA) and Head of Sports Committee, Delhi Lawn Tennis Association (DLTA), Shri Dilip Mohanty, CEO of Neelachal Sports Foundation. Odisha Tennis Premier League Season-3 Opening Ceremony was held at KIIT Tennis Complex, Campus-8, Bhubaneswar. Guests present were Hon’ble Governor of Odisha Prof. Ganeshi Lal and Shri Vishal Kumar Dev, IAS, Commissioner Cum Secretary of Sports and Youth Services, Government of Odisha.

Odisha Tennis Premier League Season-1 was held on 19–23 November 2017 at Kalinga Stadium, Bhubaneswar. Season-2 was held in 16–20 January 2019 at Kalinga Stadium, Bhubaneswar and Season-3 was held in 4–8 December 2019 at KIIT, Campus-8, Bhubaneswar with great enthusiasm and fanfare. It was well accepted by the tennis enthusiasts and was widely acclaimed by the government, media, sports fraternity and public at large. The success of the Season 1, 2 and 3 encouraged the organizers to come forward with the current edition with greater zeal and vigor.

== Trophy ==
Odisha Tennis Premier League Trophy Unveiling during the ceremony was held at Hotel Ashoka, New Delhi on 5 December 2018. It is made of brass and silver, stands height at 780 mm with its base, width at 750 mm and weight 18.2 kg. It is one of the biggest champion trophies ever.

== Anthem ==
The official anthem of the Odisha Tennis Premier League is a mix of classical and electronic music and is played during the league and for ceremonial purposes. Composed and Music by Baidyanath Dash, Lyricist by Dr. Subha Kumar Dash and sung by Rituraj Mohanty & Asima Panda.

== Teams ==
S. No	Teams	Year Joined
1	Angul Acers	2017
2	Bhadrak Victors	2017
3	Cuttack Conquerors	2017
4	Kendrapara Contenders	2017
5	Khorda Warriors	2017
6	Puri Wavers	2017
7	Sambalpur Shooters	2017
8	Sundergarh Veerans	2017
9	Capital Kings	2019
10	KIIT Killer Bees	2019
11	Bhubaneswar Warriors	2019
12	Jajpur Shooters	2019

== Sponsors & Partners ==
S. No	Sponsors/Partners
1	ONGC
2	HPCL
3	BPCL
4	NLC INDIA LIMITED
5	PARUL PENSONIC
6	MAGNUM IMPEX
7	YUVRAJ LOGISTICS
8	PRINCE FACILITY MANAGEMENT SERVICES
9	GENETREE EBIOLAB
10	O VIEW ADVISORY
11	INFER DEVELOPMENT CONSULTING PVT LTD
12	DIGITUALL
13	BABOLAT
14	ICHIBAN CROP SCIENCE LTD
15	GREENLAM LAMINATES
16	AURA EVENTS
17	TORRENT ADVERTISERS
16	92.7 BIG FM
16	KALINGA INSTITUTE OF INDUSTRIAL TECHNOLOGY (KIIT)

== Champions ==
Season	Team	Year
1	Kendrapara Contenders	2017
2	Kendrapara Contenders	2018
3	Capital Kings	2019

== Venue ==
(India)
Odisha
Bhubaneswar
Kalinga Stadium
