= Japan Warriors =

Defunct Japanese tennis team

- Sport: Team tennis
- Founded: 2015
- League: International Premier Tennis League
- Team history: 2015–2016
- Arena: World Memorial Hall
- Colors: Red, White

The Japan Warriors was a tennis team based in Japan which competed in the International Premier Tennis League (IPTL). It is fifth team to join the tennis league and first participated at the 2015 season.

== Current roster ==
As of 14 April 2015

- (Russia) Maria Sharapova
- (Japan) Kei Nishikori
- (Canada) Vasek Pospisil
- (Germany) Philipp Kohlschreiber
- (India) Leander Paes
- (Sweden) Thomas Enqvist
- (Russia) Marat Safin
- (Slovakia) Daniela Hantuchová
- (France) Lucas Pouille
- (Japan) Kurumi Nara
