= UAE Royals =

Former tennis team in Dubai

- Sport: Team tennis
- Founded: 2014
- Folded: 2016
- League: International Premier Tennis League
- Team history: 2014–2016
- Based in: Dubai, United Arab Emirates
- Stadium: Dubai Duty Free Stadium
- Colors: Black, Red, Green, Metallic Gold
- Owner: Neelesh Bhatanagar, Sachin Gadoya and Virat Kohli
- Head coach: John-Laffnie de Jager
- Broadcasters: Abu Dhabi Media
- Website: www.uaeroyals.com

The UAE Royals were a tennis team based in Dubai, United Arab Emirates that competed in the International Premier Tennis League (IPTL) from its inception in 2014 until the league's final season in 2016. It is one of four charter franchises that participated in the IPTL's inaugural 2014 season where it finished as runners-up. The team started its 2015 season with marquee signings in Roger Federer and Ana Ivanovic.

== Team history ==
=== Founding of franchise ===
On 21 January 2014, IPTL announced that one of the charter franchises for the league's inaugural 2014 season would be based in the Middle East. On 2 March 2014, IPTL revealed that the Middle East franchise would play its home matches in Dubai, United Arab Emirates. The team is owned by Neelesh Bhatnagar, a leading Dubai-based businessman, and Sachin Gadoya, managing director of Musafir.com, an Internet-based travel agency. Indian cricketer Virat Kohli was also introduced as the co-owner of the franchise on September 10, 2015.

=== Inaugural draft ===
The Dubai franchise participated in the IPTL inaugural draft on 2 March 2014, in Dubai, United Arab Emirates. Players selected by Dubai were

Player	IPTL Category
Men
(Serbia) Novak Djokovic (Serbian: Новак Ђоковић)	Icon players
(Serbia) Janko Tipsarević (Serbian: Јанко Типсаревић)	Category D
(Croatia) Goran Ivanišević	Past champions
(Serbia) Nenad Zimonjić (Serbian: Ненад Зимоњић)	Doubles players
(Tunisia) Malek Jaziri (Arabic: مالك الجزيري)	Uncategorized
Women
(Denmark) Caroline Wozniacki	Icon players
(Switzerland) Martina Hingis	Category C

=== Team name ===
By May 2014, the team was being referred to as the UAE Falcons. By June 2014, the Falcons had become known as the UAE Royals.

=== Home venue ===
The UAE Royals will play their home matches at the Dubai Duty Free Stadium for the 2015 season. The team played their home matches at the Hamdan bin Mohammed bin Rashid Sports Complex during the first season of the league.

=== First coach ===
On 27 October 2014, John-Laffnie de Jager was named the Royals' first coach.

=== Inaugural season ===
The Royals opened their inaugural season with a road match on 28 November 2014, against the Manila Mavericks in Pasay, Metropolitan Manila, Philippines. It played its first home match on 11 December 2014, also against the Mavericks.

== Television coverage ==
On 22 August 2014, IPTL announced it had reached an agreement for the Middle East and North Africa television broadcasting rights with Abu Dhabi Media. The rights continue with Abu Dhabi Media for 2015 season.

== Former roster ==
Player
(Switzerland) Martina Hingis
(Serbia) Ana Ivanovic
(Croatia) Marin Čilić
(Croatia) Goran Ivanišević
(Czech Republic) Tomáš Berdych
(Canada) Daniel Nestor
(France) Kristina Mladenovic
