= Indira Gandhi Arena =

Indoor arena in India

Coordinates: 28°37′52″N 77°14′58″E

Indira Gandhi Indoor Stadium इंदिरा गांधी इंडोर स्टेडियम
- Indira Gandhi Arena
- Interactive map of Indira Gandhi Indoor Stadium इंदिरा गांधी इंडोर स्टेडियम
- Full name: Indira Gandhi Indoor Stadium
- Location: Indraprastha Estate, New Delhi
- Owner: Government of India
- Operator: Sports Authority of India
- Capacity: 14,349

Construction
- Opened: 1 January 1982; 44 years ago
- Renovated: 2010
- Cost: ₹240 crore (Renovation) in 2010

Website
- Indira Gandhi Indoor Stadium

The Indira Gandhi Arena (officially Indira Gandhi Indoor Stadium), formerly known as the Indraprashtha Stadium, is located at the Indraprastha Estate in the eastern part of New Delhi, though part of Central Delhi, Delhi, India. It is the largest indoor sports arena in India and among the largest in Asia. The multi-purpose arena is regularly used by tennis club Indian Aces and DSA Senior Division Futsal League.

== History ==
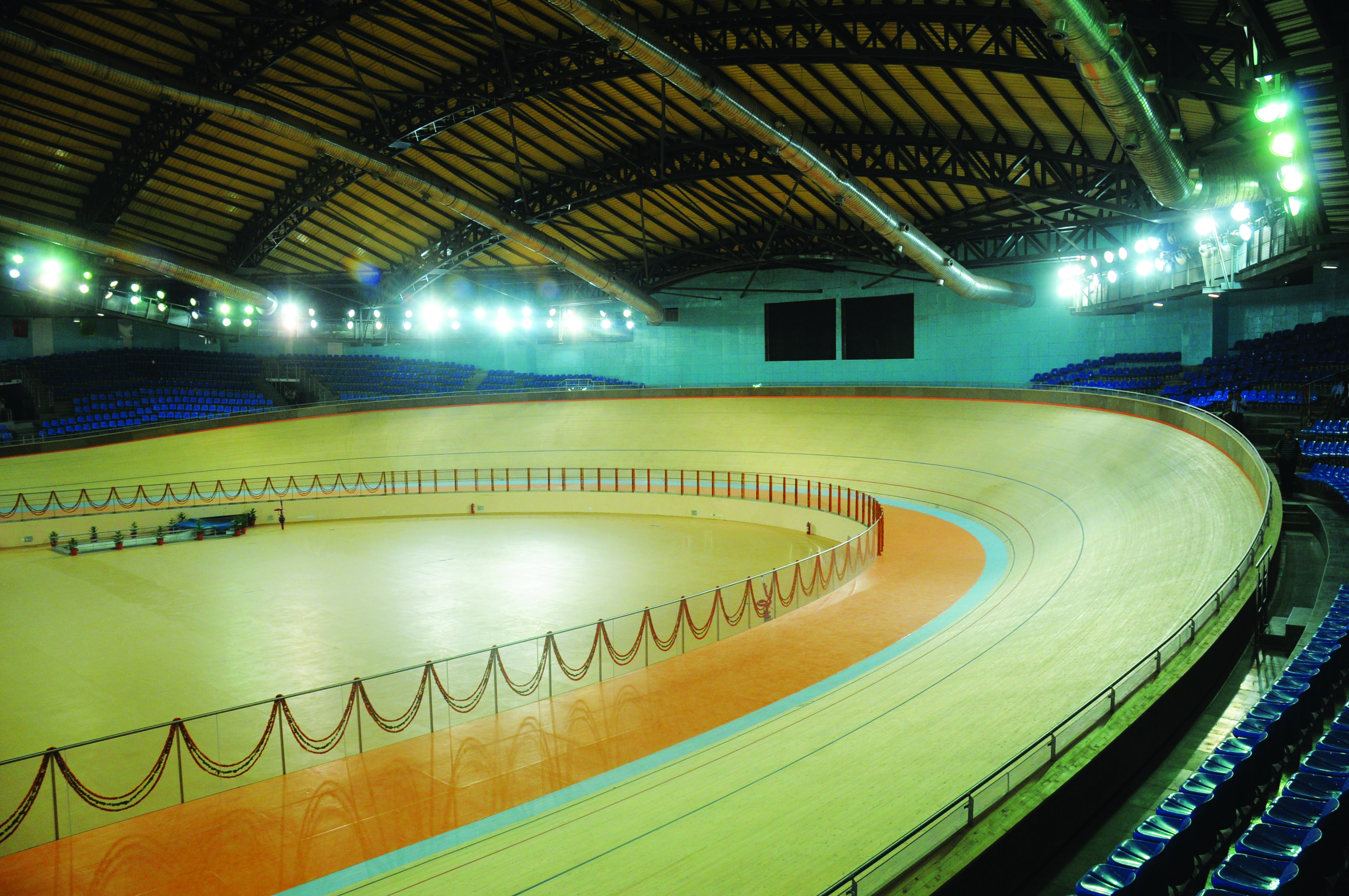
Velodrome at the complex

Built by the Government of India in 1982 in order to host the indoor games events in the 1982 Asian Games, the arena's grounds cover an area of 102 acres (0.41 km^{2}). Since its construction, the arena hosted a number of other tournaments as well. The facility seats 14,348 people and is named after former Prime Minister of India Indira Gandhi. The venue also hosts political events and music events in addition to sports events like tennis and kabaddi matches.

Since its inception, the arena has been repeatedly renovated and modernized. Equipped with soundproof synthetics walls, lighting systems, and audio system, the arena underwent another renovation for the 2010 Commonwealth Games.

It was renovated for the 2010 Commonwealth Games at a cost of ₹240 crore.

A new air-conditioned Velodrome has been built costing ₹150 crore (U$33.76 million).

The stadium hosted matches of first ever International Premier Tennis League tournament played on 6 December 2014 to 8 December 2014. Tennis club Indian Aces are tenants.

On 15 and 16 January 2016, WWE would host their live events in this arena, both headlined by Roman Reigns WWE World title defence against Big Show and Rusev respectively. WWE would later return to the arena on 9 December 2017 with Jinder Mahal taking on Triple H in the main event.

The 2023 IBA women's amateur boxing world championships took place at the stadium, from 16 March to 26 March.

The arena received minor upgrades prior to the 2026 BWF World Championships.

== Other facilities ==
There are 2 other venues located in the same complex with the arena:

=== Indira Gandhi Indoor Cycling Velodrome ===
Indira Gandhi Indoor Cycling Velodrome is a 3,800 seater velodrome that hosted track cycling events of 2010 Commonwealth Games.

=== KD Jadhav Indoor Hall ===
The KD Jadhav Indoor Hall is a 6,000-capacity indoor stadium that hosted wrestling events for the 2010 Commonwealth Games. After three months without official name, it was finally named after Indian wrestler K. D. Jadhav who won Independent India's first individual medal at the Olympics i.e. a bronze medal at the 1952 Summer Olympics.
