= SM Mall of Asia Arena =

Indoor arena in Pasay, Philippines

- SM MoA Arena

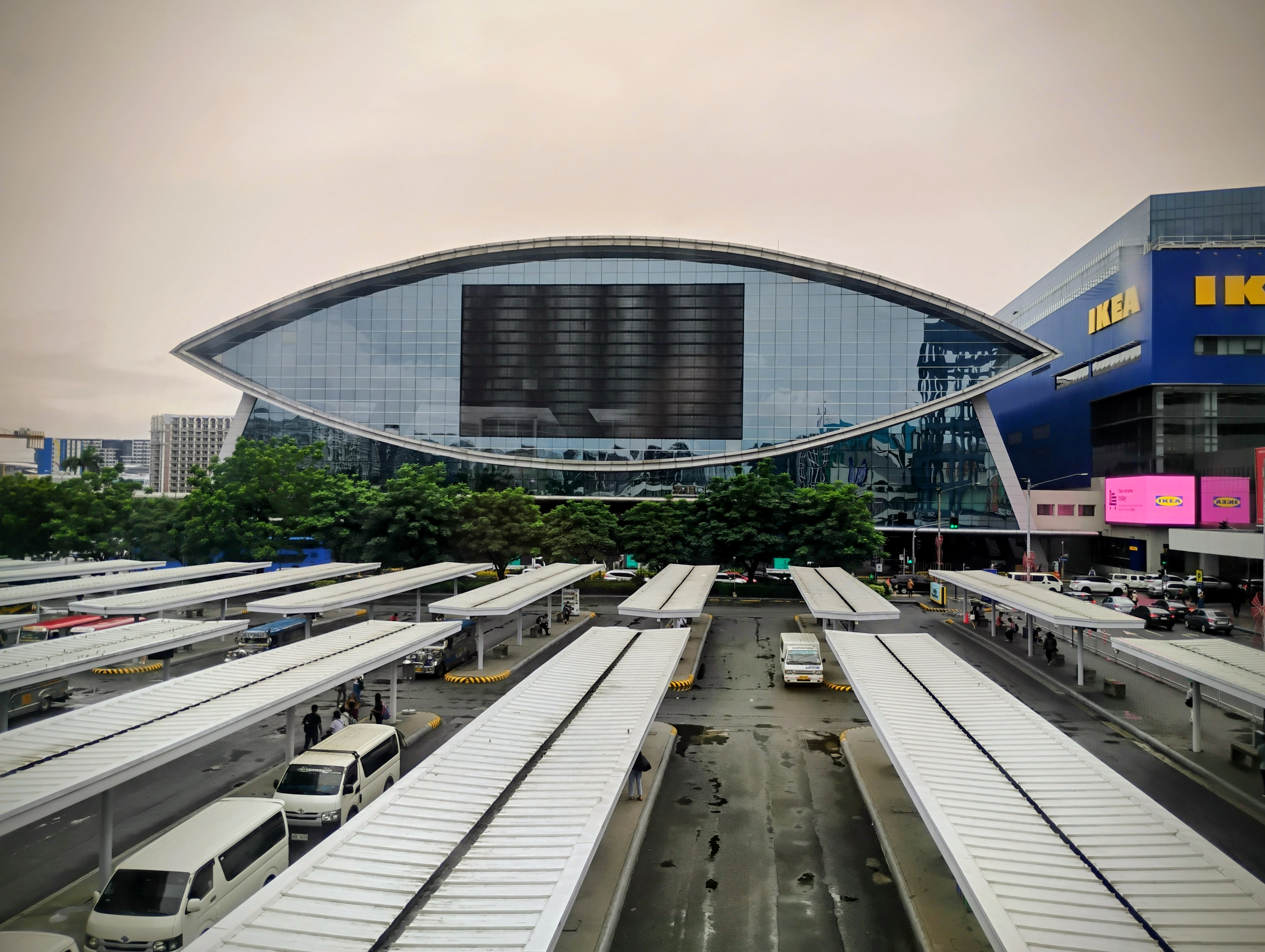
- The arena in 2025
- Interactive map of SM Mall of Asia Arena
- Location: MOA Complex, Jose W. Diokno Boulevard cor. Coral Way and Marina Way, Bay City, Pasay, Metro Manila, Philippines
- Coordinates: 14°31′55″N 120°59′1″E
- Owner: SM Lifestyle Entertainment
- Operator: SM Tickets
- Capacity: 15,000 (standard seating); 20,000 (full house)
- Executive suites: 41
- Type: Indoor arena
- Scoreboard: Daktronics Galaxy 4-side JumboTron with Daktronics All-Sport 5000 Series
- Record attendance: 25,388 (UAAP Season 78 Cheerdance Competition, October 3, 2015)
- Public transit: E SM Mall of Asia SM Mall of Asia: 4 5 6 7 14 30 34 43 52; Esplanade Seaside Terminal; SM Mall of Asia Transport Terminal

Construction
- Groundbreaking: 2010
- Opened: May 21, 2012 (first event); June 16, 2012 (grand opening)
- Cost: ₱3.6 billion
- Architect: Arquitectonica
- Project managers: Jose Siao Ling & Associates
- General contractors: Monolith Construction and Development Corporation

Tenants
- Philippines men's national basketball team Philippines women's national basketball team Philippines men's national volleyball team PBA (2012–present); UAAP (2012–present); NCAA (2012-present); PVL (2014–present); Philippine Mavericks (2014–2015); SM NBTC (2015–present)

Website
- sm-arena.com/moa

The SM Mall of Asia Arena (abbreviated as SM MoA Arena) is an indoor arena within the SM Mall of Asia complex, in Bay City, Pasay, Metro Manila, Philippines. It officially opened on May 21, 2012, with a total area of 52,000 m^{2} (560,000 sq ft) and a seating capacity of 15,000. The arena has hosted over 2,400 shows since its opening.

The SM Mall of Asia Arena is one of the main venues for the Philippine Basketball Association, Premier Volleyball League, University Athletic Association of the Philippines and the National Collegiate Athletic Association.

== History ==
Logo until 2025

The construction of the arena began in 2010, and costed around ₱3.6 billion. The venue is part of the master plan for the SM Mall of Asia complex which in 2012 already had the SMX Convention Center and the One E-com and Two E-com office buildings.

The arena had its topping-off ceremony in September 2011 and was opened about two years later after it broke ground. The first public event hosted at the indoor arena was the two-night Born This Way Ball concert of Lady Gaga which began on May 21, 2012. A separate event was held as part of the grand opening ceremony of the indoor arena held on June 16, 2012; the Icons at the Arena: Masters of OPM which featured various local musicians and singers which was organized by Star Events of ABS-CBN, directed by Johnny Manahan with Ryan Cayabyab as the concert's musical director.

The arena was refurbished ahead of the 2023 FIBA Basketball World Cup.

== Architecture and design ==
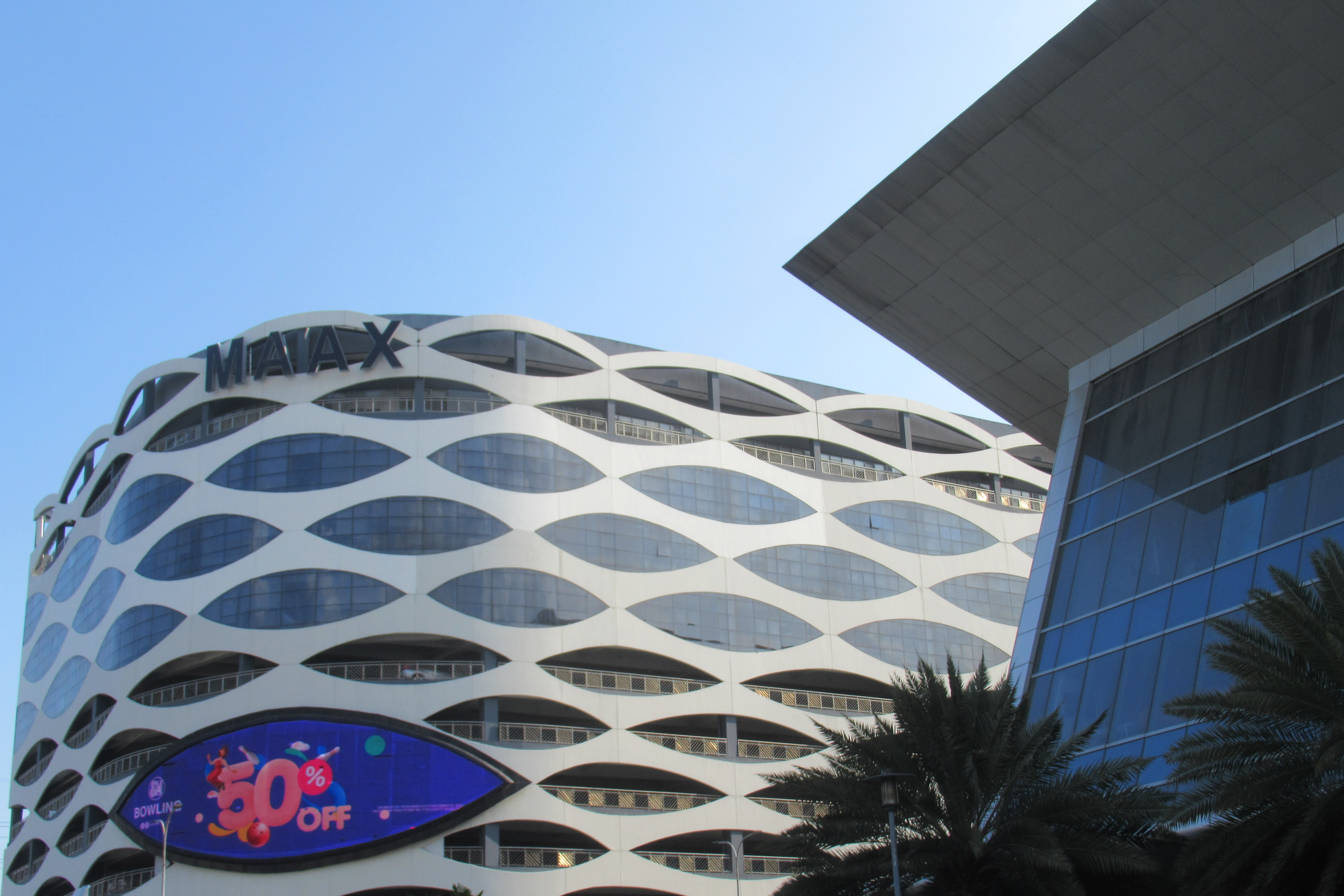
Mall of Asia Arena Annex Building (left) standing next to the SM Mall of Asia Arena (right)

The SM Mall of Asia Arena was designed by architecture firm Arquitectonica. The facility was intended primarily as a venue for concerts and basketball games but can be reconfigured to accommodate other sporting and entertainment events as well. It has a seating capacity of 15,000 but can host as much as 20,000 people in a full-house capacity.

The indoor arena stands on a 16,000 m^{2} (170,000 sq ft) site, and has a floor area of 52,000 m^{2} (560,000 sq ft). The limited area of the site meant that part of the building to span over the adjacent Pacific Drive. Due to a high water table, the construction of basement parking levels was limited and a separate eight-storey parking building called Mall of Asia Arena Annex (MAAX) which can accommodate 1,400 vehicles had to be built. The façade of the building are covered with low-e coated and fritted insulated glass units.

The structure hosting the events space was designed in a form of an eye which was supported by a slanted podium plinth.

The venue uses NBA-specification shot clocks, with Daktronics BB-2160 and BB-2161 shot clocks (used by the NBA along with models from OES until the 2016–17 NBA season due to the NBA using Tissot ones) that count tenths in the final five seconds, though recently it has been stretched to the final nine seconds.

On May 14, 2025, nearly thirteen years after the arena's opening, the centerhung jumbotron was upgraded. Dubbed "The Cube" and manufactured by Daktronics, the new jumbotron is 176 m^{2} (1,890 sq ft) in size with a main display resolution of 1344x672 pixels. It was unveiled ahead of the finals of the UAAP Season 87 volleyball tournaments that day as well as the 2025 FIVB Men's Volleyball World Championship.

== Facilities ==
The indoor arena hosts the Premiere Suites which is reportedly the first luxury box in Southeast Asia. The luxury box has a total of 41 suites. A private restaurant, the Premiere Café + Lounge, serves patrons of the luxury box.

== Notable events ==
=== Entertainment events ===
The arena has hosted various entertainment events since its opening in 2012, from music concerts of local and international artists, beauty pageant ceremonies, to different functions for the country's biggest entertainment companies.

On February 22, 2015, ABS-CBN's ASAP celebrated their 20th Anniversary celebration at the arena. Months later, on July 26, 2015, GMA Network celebrated its 65th anniversary through a fans' day entitled "Thank You, Kapuso!" at the arena. Since 2016, the arena has also hosted Disney on Ice productions every December, except on years that were restricted due to the COVID-19 pandemic in the Philippines.

==== Music concerts ====
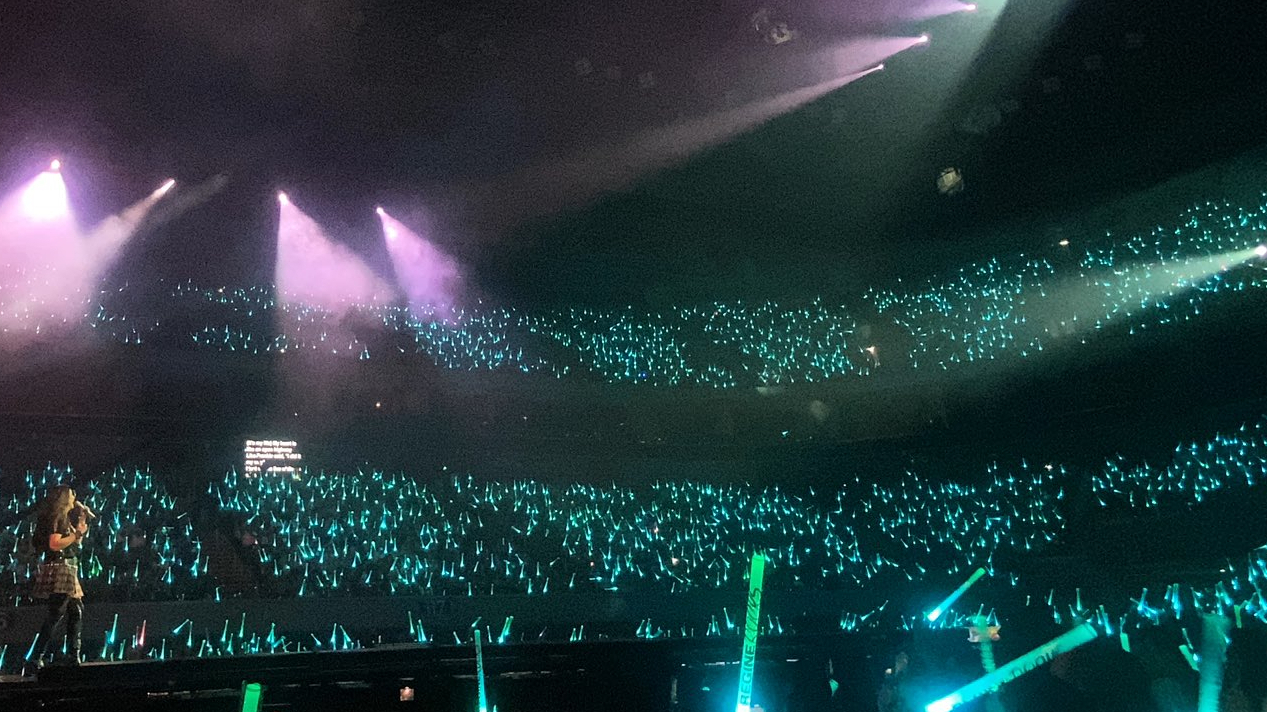
Regine Velasquez during her Regine Rocks concert at the arena in November 2023

Lady Gaga held the first concerts at the arena, selling out her two-night Born This Way Ball tour on May 21–22, 2012. Regine Velasquez was the first Filipino artist to stage a solo concert. and has performed more times than any other artist. Several other international artists have performed at the arena.

In 2015, Darren Espanto became the youngest artist to hold a solo show at the arena at age 14. During its time, Madonna's Rebel Heart Tour concerts on February 24–25, 2016 were the most expensive concerts in the Philippines with ticket costs ranging from ₱3,150 to ₱57,750 per person. One Ok Rock was the first Japanese artist to headline a show in the arena, while EXO was the first Korean artist to stage a two-day sold-out concert series in the arena, followed by other K-pop groups such as Big Bang, Blackpink, BTS, 2NE1, Winner, iKON, AKMU, Treasure and Twice.

Celine Dion, who performed at the arena on July 19 and 20, 2018, as part of her Celine Dion Live 2018 tour, is the venue's highest-grossing female artist with nearly $4,000,000 between the two shows.

==== Pageants ====
The arena regularly hosts the Miss Universe Philippines pageant annually since 2022. Additionally, Eat Bulaga!'s grand coronation day of Miss Millennial Philippines 2017 was also held at the arena on September 30, 2017.

Two of the Big Four international beauty pageants have been held in the arena— Miss Earth and Miss Universe.

- Miss Earth 2016 on October 29, 2016
- Miss Universe 2016 on January 30, 2017
- Miss Earth 2017 on November 4, 2017
- Miss Earth 2018 on November 3, 2018.

=== Basketball ===
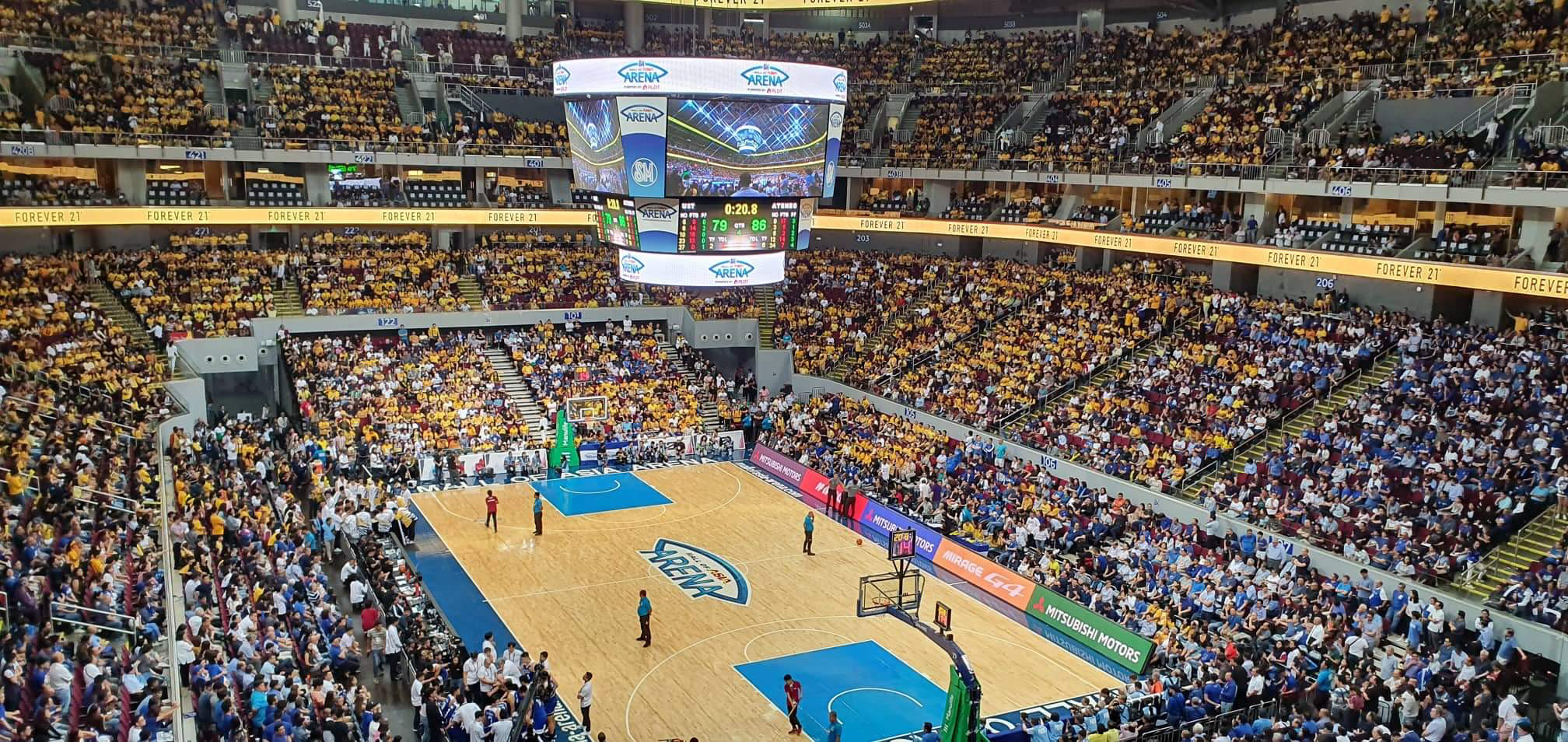
The SM Mall of Asia Arena during the Season 82 UAAP basketball finals in 2019

The SM Mall of Asia Arena serves as one of the playing venues of the Philippine Basketball Association (PBA), National Collegiate Athletic Association (Philippines), and the University Athletic Association of the Philippines (UAAP).

The PBA's B-Meg Llamados and the Talk 'N Text Tropang Texters played the first basketball game at the arena on July 7, 2012, as part of the 2012 PBA Governors Cup semifinals.

The UAAP's 2012 opening game between the NU Bulldogs and UE Red Warriors on July 14, 2012, was the arena's first college basketball game. The first game of the 2012 UAAP basketball finals was played at the arena in front of 20,686 people. On October 18, 2012, the arena hosted the National Collegiate Athletic Association's first game of its finals series against the San Beda Red Lions and the Letran Knights.

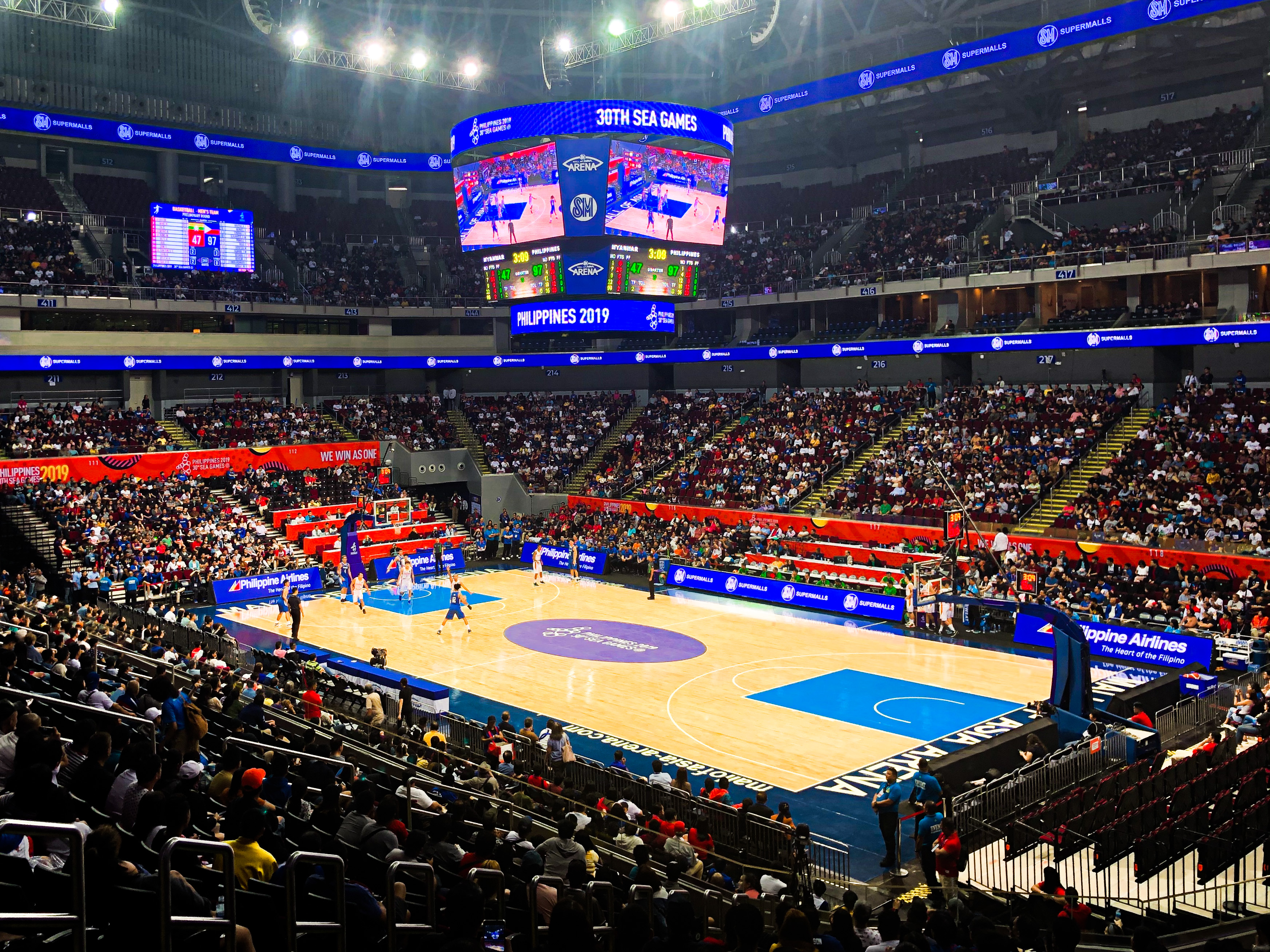
The arena during a 2019 Southeast Asian Games match between the Philippines and Myanmar

The arena hosted Tanduay Alab Pilipinas' first game of the 2017–18 ABL season. It was the first time that Alab played in an arena as large as the Mall of Asia Arena, and the first ABL game in the arena.

The arena also hosted various Maharlika Pilipinas Basketball League (MPBL) events, including the first two MPBL All-Star Games in 2019 and 2020, opening gameday the 2019–20 season, and the 2021 MPBL Invitational, which was the first event to allow a live audience since the COVID-19 pandemic in a half capacity.

The basketball tournament of the 2019 Southeast Asian Games was held at the arena, the Philippines bagged the gold for both the men's and women's tournament. It was the Philippines men's national basketball team's 13th consecutive gold medal.

==== NBA Global Games ====
The NBA of the United States played its first-ever Global Games in the Philippines on October 10, 2013, with a first preseason game between Houston Rockets and the Indiana Pacers. Rockets dominated Pacers in a 116–96 win. It was the first ever NBA game played in Southeast Asia.

==== FIBA Asia Cup ====
The Philippines hosted the 2013 FIBA Asia Championship on August 1–11, 2013. The arena served as the main venue with the Ninoy Aquino Stadium as the second venue for the tournament. It recorded an attendance of 19,989 during the final game between the host Philippines and Iran.

==== Olympic Qualifying Tournaments ====
The SM Mall of Asia Arena was one of the three main venues of the 2016 FIBA World Olympic Qualifying Tournaments for Men, which was held in the Philippines, Italy, and Serbia from July 4–10, 2016. This is the second FIBA tournament held at the arena

==== FIBA Basketball World Cup ====
The arena served as one of the host venues for the 2023 FIBA Basketball World Cup, which was hosted by the Philippines from August 25 to September 10, 2023, alongside co-hosts Japan and Indonesia. The arena hosted all games up to the final round of the tournament. The arena has also hosted several World Cup qualification games for three qualification cycles (2019, 2023, 2027).

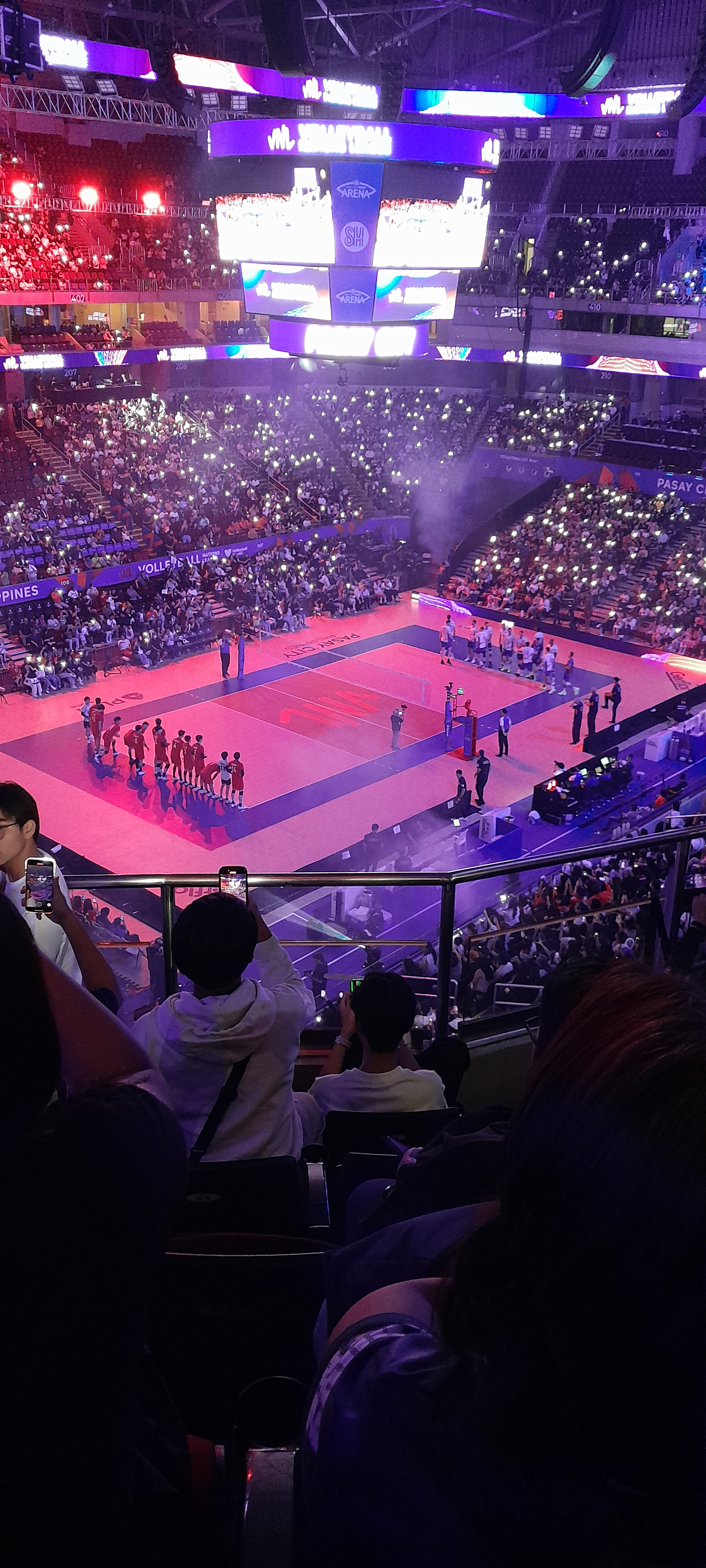
The start of the match at the arena between the Japan and the Netherlands teams during the June 2024 FIVB Men's Volleyball Nations League Pool 6 matches.

=== Volleyball ===
The SM Mall of Asia Arena serves as one of the playing venues of the Premier Volleyball League (PVL).

On March 6, 2013, the DLSU Lady Spikers became the first team in any Philippine sports to celebrate the first-ever championship in the arena in front of an 18,779 crowd, when they won the UAAP women's volleyball championship.

On October 9, 2017, the Ateneo Lady Eagles and De La Salle Lady Spikers played a volleyball match, dubbed "The Battle of the Rivals", in reference to their rivalry being noted as the well-known rivalry in Philippine sports. Different generations of the teams between Season 74 to Season 78 came together to play against each other, and proceeds of the game would go to each school's charity foundation, and Rebisco Foundation Inc.

Pasay was one of the host cities for the 2023 FIVB Men's Volleyball Nations League preliminary round, which marked the second straight year the event was held in the Philippines and the first time Pasay would be a host city for the league. The arena hosted the pool 6 matches from July 4 to 9, 2023.

The next year, Pasay hosted the league's Pool 6 matches anew at the arena, held from June 18 to 23.

=== Other sports ===
- The Manila Mavericks of the International Premier Tennis League played their home matches in the arena in the league's inaugural season on November 28–30, 2014.
- The UFC held their first event in the Philippines, UFC Fight Night: Edgar vs. Faber, on May 16, 2015.
- In June 2015, the Monster Jam motorsport event performed at the arena.
- From June 7–12, 2016, the arena held a professional Dota 2 eSports tournament, known as the Manila Major 2016, which was hosted by Valve and produced by PGL eSports. The Manila Major is the third event of Valve's Dota Major Championships where 16 international teams competed.
- On August 18–19, 2018, a regional League of Legends tournament, known as The Globe Conquerors Manila, took place. The winner was given the chance to represent Southeast Asia at the League of Legends World Championship.

=== Religious events ===
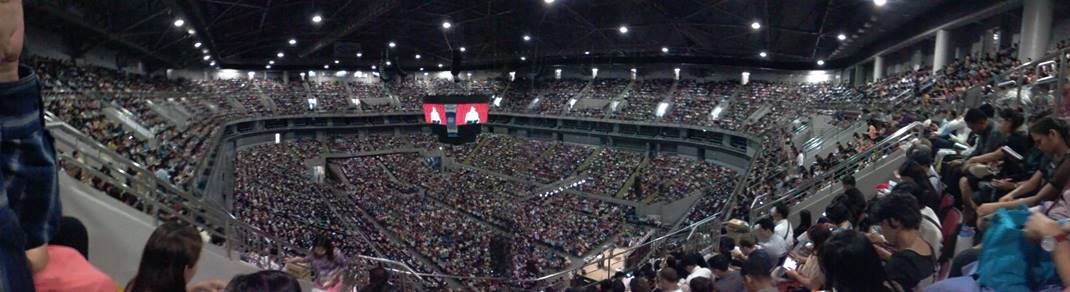
A Jehovah's Witnesses meeting at the arena in 2015

The arena served as the main venue for the Encounter with the Families event, led by Pope Francis during his papal visit to the Philippines on January 16, 2015. The event was a dialogue between Pope Francis and an audience of families. The arena also hosted Bo Sanchez's Kerygma Conference (now Feast Conference) in 2012 and annually from 2014 to 2019.

The arena also hosted several events of various churches, including Victory Christian Fellowship. In 2019, the Jesus Global Youth Day was also held at the arena. After years of performing at the Smart Araneta Coliseum in the 2010s, Australian Christian worship band Planetshakers started performing at the arena during the 2020s whenever they embarked on tours in the Philippines, having performed at the arena thrice following their recent tour in July 2025. The band will again play at the arena in July 2026.

On December 9, 2016, Ang Dating Daan celebrated its 36th broadcast anniversary at the arena with a Special Worldwide Bible Exposition.

In November 2019, the arena served as the main venue (for the 'Love Never Fails'! International Convention of Jehovah's Witnesses in which around 20,000 delegates from different countries attended the event.

=== Other ===
- On December 30, 2014, the arena served as the venue for the wedding reception of actors Dingdong Dantes and Marian Rivera.
- On November 18, 2015, the arena served as the venue for the welcome dinner hosted by then-President Benigno Aquino III for the visiting economic leaders (mostly heads of government) participating at the APEC Economic Leaders' Meeting.
- The Autism Society Philippines has held the Angels Walk for Autism every year since 2014.
- Amidst the COVID-19 pandemic in the Philippines, the arena was converted into a mega swabbing center with 72 testing booths and opened on May 11, 2020.

== Attendance records ==
One-day record for most attended event (Note: Based on available data.)
Type	Event	Attendance	Date	Ref.
Overall	UAAP Season 78 Cheerdance Competition	25,388	October 3, 2015	
Basketball	Barangay Ginebra San Miguel vs. TNT Tropang 5G; 2026 PBA Commissioner's Cup finals	24,617	June 17, 2026	
Volleyball	NU Lady Bulldogs vs. UST Golden Tigresses; UAAP Season 86 Women's Volleyball Finals	22,515	May 15, 2024	

== See also ==
- SM Mall of Asia
- SM Seaside Cebu Arena

Events
Preceded by Wukesong Arena (China) Beijing	FIBA World Cup; Final venue 2023	Succeeded by Lusail Sports Arena (Qatar) Doha
Preceded by PH Live (United States) Las Vegas	Miss Universe Venue; 2016	Succeeded by PH Live (United States) Las Vegas
Preceded by Davao del Sur Coliseum	Host of the PBA All-Star Game; 2014	Succeeded by Puerto Princesa City Coliseum
Preceded by First venue	Host of the MPBL All-Star Game; 2019–2020	Succeeded by Batangas City Sports Coliseum
Preceded by First venue	Host of the MPBL Preseason Invitational; 2021	Succeeded by Lagao Gymnasium
