= Singapore Slammers =

Defunct Singaporean tennis team

- Sport: Team tennis
- Founded: 2014
- Folded: 2016
- League: International Premier Tennis League
- Team history: 2014–2016
- Based in: Singapore
- Stadium: Singapore Indoor Stadium
- Colors: Red, Green
- Owner: Sunil Gavaskar Kishan Gehlot Shashi Kiran Shetty Ajay Sethi Avi Bhojani
- President: Vikas Gehlot
- Head coach: Purav Raja; Joshua Eagle (2014)
- Championships: 1(2015)
- Broadcasters: SingTel
- Website: www.singaporeslammers.com

The Singapore Slammers (officially the DBS Singapore Slammers pursuant to a sponsorship agreement with DBS Bank) were a tennis team based in the city state of Singapore that competed in the International Premier Tennis League (IPTL). It is one of the four charter franchises which took part in the IPTL's inaugural 2014 season.

== Team history ==
=== Founding of franchise ===
On 21 January 2014, IPTL announced that one of the charter franchises for the league's inaugural 2014 season would be based in Singapore. The team was founded by Indian cricket legend Sunil Gavaskar and international business executives Kishan Gehlot, Shashi Kiran Shetty, Avi Bhojani, and Ajay Sethi. Gehlot is the chairman of East African real estate development and healthcare conglomerate Intex Group. Shetty is chairman of Allcargo Logistics Limited. Sethi is chairman of Channel 2 in Dubai. They collectively invested US$15 million to own the franchise.

=== Inaugural draft ===
The Singapore franchise participated in the IPTL inaugural draft on 2 March 2014, in Dubai, United Arab Emirates. Players selected by Singapore were

Player	IPTL Category
Men
(United States) Andre Agassi	Icon players
(Czech Republic) Tomáš Berdych	Category A
(Australia) Lleyton Hewitt	Category B
(Australia) Patrick Rafter	Past champions
(Brazil) Bruno Soares	Doubles players
(Australia) Nick Kyrgios	Uncategorized
Women
(United States) Serena Williams	Icon players
(Slovakia) Daniela Hantuchová	Category C

=== Team name ===
By May 2014, the team was being referred to as the Singapore Lions. By June 2014, the Lions had become known as the Singapore Slammers.

=== Home venue ===
On 4 August 2014, the Slammers announced that their home matches would be played at Singapore Indoor Stadium.

=== First coach ===
On 27 October 2014, Joshua Eagle was named the Slammers' first coach.

=== Inaugural season ===
On 28 November 2014, the Indian Aces defeated the Slammers, 26–16, in the first match in IPTL history.

The Slammers' first home match will be on 2 December 2014, against the Manila Mavericks.

== Television coverage ==
On 7 November 2014, IPTL announced it had reached an agreement for the Singapore television broadcasting rights with SingTel.

== Sponsorship ==
On 20 November 2014, DBS Bank Ltd announced that it had become the Slammers' title sponsor.

For the 2015 Season, local Singapore company UD Group, together with one of the best known faces and voices of global cinema, Amitabh Bachchan acquired the team and renamed the team OUE Singapore Slammers.

== Current roster ==
As of 17 December 2015

- (United Kingdom) Andy Murray
- (Spain) Carlos Moyá
- (Switzerland) Stan Wawrinka
- (Brazil) Marcelo Melo
- (Australia) Nick Kyrgios
- (Czech Republic) Karolína Plíšková
- (Switzerland) Belinda Bencic
- (Germany) Dustin Brown
