= Hamdan Sports Complex =

Multi-purpose sports arena in Dubai, UAE

- Interactive map of Hamdan Sports Complex
- Full name: Hamdan Sports Complex
- Location: Dubai, United Arab Emirates
- Coordinates: 25.0512548°N 55.3180397°E
- Owner: Dubai Municipality
- Capacity: 15,000

Construction
- Groundbreaking: May 2008
- Opened: 10 October 2010
- Cost: AED1.1 billion US$ 300 million EUR 244 million
- Architect: Binladin Contracting Group LLC
- Project manager: Binladin Contracting Group LLC
- Structural engineer: Binladin Contracting Group LLC
- General contractor: Binladin Contracting Group LLC
- Main contractor: Binladin Contracting Group LLC

Tenants
- 2010 World Swimming Championships (25m); 2014 FIBA Under-17 World Championship; IPTL (2014-present); BWF World Superseries Finals (2014-2017)

The Hamdan Sports Complex is a multi-purpose sports arena in Dubai, United Arab Emirates. The arena was completed in summer 2010. It hosted the 2010 FINA World Swimming Championships (25 m), in which 153 countries participated. It also hosted the final games of the 2014 FIBA Under-17 World Championship and the 2015 FIVB Volleyball Men's U23 World Championship. The stadium hosts various international aquatic events. It has a total capacity of 15,000 spectators. Beside aquatic events, such as swimming, it also accommodates badminton, basketball, karate, swimming, tennis, volleyball and water polo.

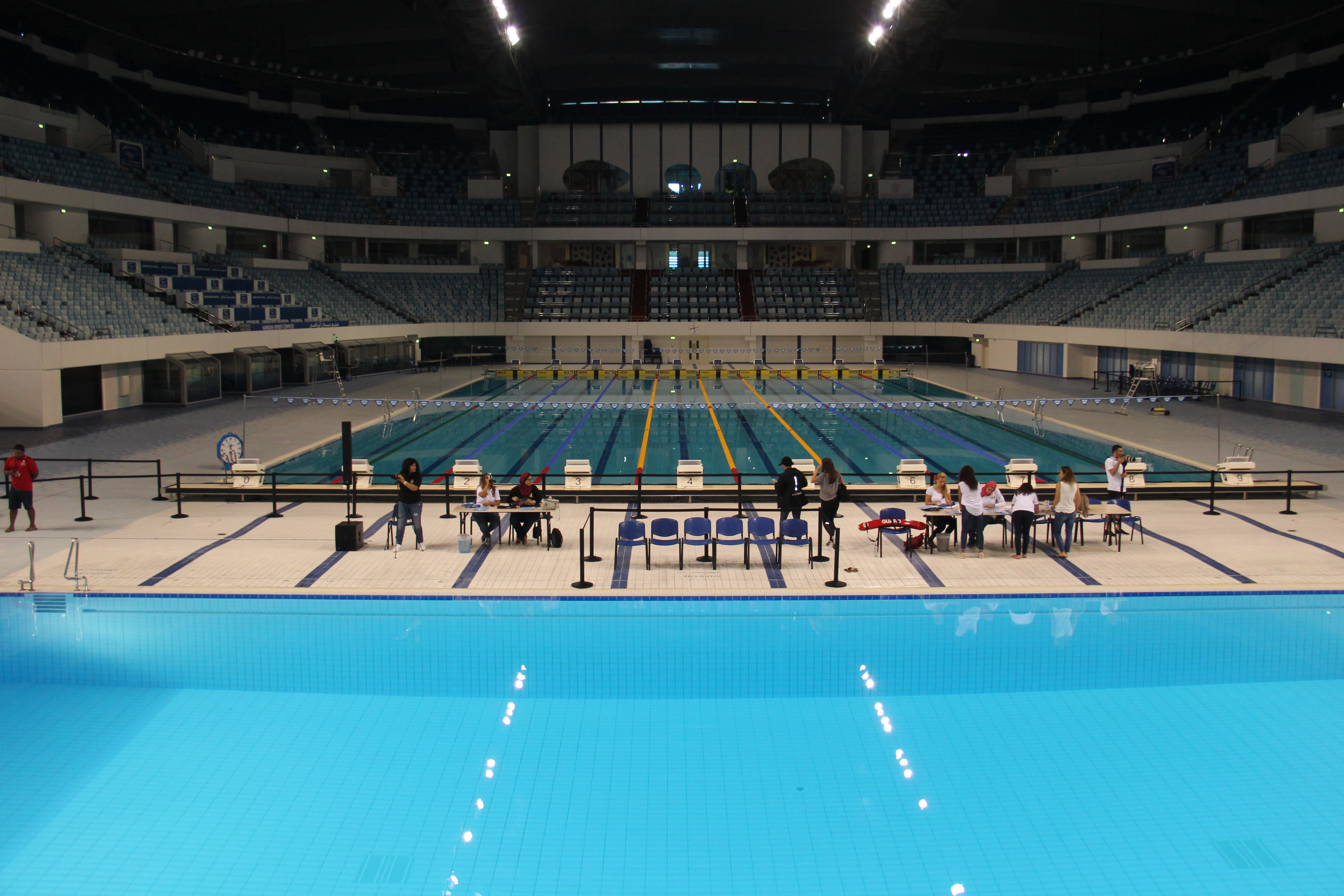
Hamdan Sports Complex

== Notable events ==
=== Major events ===
- World Swimming Championships: 2010
- Asian Men's Volleyball Championship: 2013
- FINA Swimming World Cup: 2016
- Special Olympics World Games: 2019
- World Karate Championships: 2021

=== Other events ===
The Philippines' Maharlika Pilipinas Basketball League hosted its first series of international games at the venue.

== See also ==
- Dubai Sports City
- List of development projects in Dubai

Preceded by Manchester Arena; Manchester	FINA World Swimming Championships (25 m); Venue; 2010	Succeeded by Sinan Erdem Dome; Istanbul
Preceded by Žalgiris Arena; Kaunas	FIBA; FIBA Under-17 World Championship; Venue; 2014	Succeeded by TBD
