= Philippine Mavericks =

Defunct Filipino tennis team

- Sport: Team tennis
- Founded: 2014
- Folded: 2016
- League: International Premier Tennis League
- Team history: Unnamed Bangkok-based franchise 2014; Manila Mavericks; 2014–2015; Philippine Mavericks; 2015–2016
- Based in: Pasay, Metro Manila, Philippines
- Arena: Mall of Asia Arena
- Colors: Royal Azure, Vivid Golden Yellow, Strong Red
- Owner: Hans T. Sy; Jean Henri D. Lhuillier; Kevin Belmonte; Haresh Hiranand; Bala Swaminathan
- Head coach: Mark Philippoussis
- Broadcasters: Sports5
- Website: www.manilamavericks.net

The Philippine Mavericks, initially known as the Manila Mavericks, were a tennis team based in Pasay, Metro Manila, Philippines that competed in the International Premier Tennis League (IPTL). It is one of four charter franchises participating in the IPTL's inaugural 2014 season. It last competed in the 2015 season of the IPTL.

== History ==
=== Foundation ===
On 21 January 2014, IPTL announced that one of the charter franchises for the league's inaugural 2014 season would be based in Bangkok.

==== Inaugural draft ====
The Bangkok franchise (as the Mavericks were still known at the time) participated in the IPTL inaugural draft on 2 March 2014, in Dubai, United Arab Emirates. Players selected by Bangkok were

Player	IPTL Category
Men
(United Kingdom) Andy Murray	Icon players
(France) Jo-Wilfried Tsonga	Category A
(Spain) Carlos Moyá	Past champions
(Canada) Daniel Nestor	Doubles players
Women
(Belarus) Victoria Azarenka	Icon players
(Belgium) Kirsten Flipkens	Category D

==== Move to Manila ====
On 10 May 2014, before the founder and owner of the franchise had been revealed to the public, IPTL announced that the Bangkok franchise would be moved to Metro Manila, Philippines due to the 2013–14 Thai political crisis. The ownership group that moved the team to Manila comprises Filipinos Hans T. Sy, Jean Henri Lhuillier, Kevin Belmonte, Haresh Hiranand, and Bala Swaminathan. Sy is president of SM Prime Holdings, the largest shopping mall operator in the Philippines. Lhuillier is the president and CEO of PJ Lhuillier Group of Companies, which operates Cebuana Lhuillier Pawnshop, a large pawnshop chain in the Philippines, as well as related businesses.

By June 2014, the Manila franchise had been named the Manila Mavericks.

On 27 October 2014, Manila resident Treat Huey was named the Mavericks' first coach.

=== Inaugural season ===
The Mavericks will open their inaugural season with a home match on 28 November 2014, against the UAE Royals.

Mavericks owners are Hans Sy, Jean Henri Lhuillier, Kevin Belmonte, Haresh Hiranand and foreign partner Bala Swaminathan

=== Second season ===
The Manila Mavericks changed their name to the "Philippine Mavericks".

=== Third season ===
The Mavericks will not be taking part in the third season reportedly due to financial constraints and political situation in the Philippines. However the team owners dispute this reason saying that the team is "ready and committed for the long haul", and that as businessmen, the Philippines is capable of hosting IPTL matches. They say that the IPTL failed to fulfill its obligations to the franchise and will only reconsider joining the next season if these obligations were fulfilled.

== Home venue ==
On 23 July 2014, the Mavericks announced that their home matches would be played at Smart Araneta Coliseum in Quezon City, Metropolitan Manila. On 29 August 2014, IPTL announced that the Mall of Asia Arena in Pasay, Metropolitan Manila, the first choice as a home for the Mavericks, had opened up the dates of the team's home matches making it possible for the Mavericks to play there.

== Television coverage ==
On 7 November 2014, IPTL announced it had reached an agreement for the Philippines television broadcasting rights with ABS-CBN for its 2014 season.

On November 9, 2015, IPTL went into one-year broadcast agreement with Philippine sports broadcaster Sports5 for the online and television airing of the games.

== Most recent roster ==
As of 24 November 2015

- (Philippines) Treat Huey – Player-Coach
- (United States) Serena Williams
- (United States) James Blake
- (France) Richard Gasquet
- (Canada) Milos Raonic
- (India) Somdev Devvarman
- (Australia) Mark Philippoussis
- (Australia) Ajla Tomljanović
- (France) Édouard Roger-Vasselin
- (Australia) Jarmila Wolfe
- (Croatia) Ivo Karlović
