= Indian Aces =

Tennis team based in New Delhi, India

- Sport: Team tennis
- Founded: 2014
- Folded: 2016
- League: International Premier Tennis League
- Team history: 2014–2016
- Based in: New Delhi, Delhi, India
- Stadium: Indira Gandhi Indoor Stadium
- Colors: Orange, India Green
- Owner: Siddhesh Sharma
- Head coach: Fabrice Santoro
- Championships: 1 (2014)
- Broadcasters: STAR Sports
- Website: indianaces.com

The Indian Aces were a tennis team based in New Delhi, India that competed in the International Premier Tennis League (IPTL). It is one of the four charter franchises which had participated in the IPTL's inaugural 2014 season and are champions of the first edition.

== Team history ==
=== Founding of franchise ===
On 21 January 2014, IPTL announced that one of the charter franchises for the league inaugural 2014 season would be based in Mumbai. On 19 June 2014, an IPTL press release revealed to the general public that the owner of the Indian franchise was Micromax Informatics Ltd. which preferred to have the team play its home matches in New Delhi and not in Mumbai. A group called PVP Ventures led by entrepreneur Prasad V Potluri and cricket legend Sachin Tendulkar had been the original franchise owners with a plan to play home matches in Mumbai. While league managing director Mahesh Bhupathi said PVP Ventures had been replaced by Micromax, because PVP missed a payment deadline, PVP said it had withdrawn from the league due to lack of clarity over how IPTL's business model was progressing and disagreements over player contracts. PVP did not want the team to be solely responsible for payment of player salaries and favored the league being obligated as well.

=== Inaugural draft ===
The Mumbai franchise (as the Aces were still known at the time) participated in the IPTL inaugural draft on 2 March 2014, in Dubai, United Arab Emirates.

Player	IPTL Category
Men
(Spain) Rafael Nadal (Note: Nadal was injured and did not play. He was replaced on the Aces roster by Roger Federer.)	Icon players
(United States) Pete Sampras	Icon players
(France) Gaël Monfils	Category B
(France) Fabrice Santoro	Past champions
(India) Rohan Bopanna	Doubles players
Women
(Serbia) Ana Ivanovic	Category B
(India) Sania Mirza	Category D

=== Team name ===
By May 2014, the team had been named the Indian Aces.

=== Home venue ===
On 25 July 2014, the Aces announced that their home matches would be played at Indira Gandhi Indoor Stadium in New Delhi, Delhi.

=== First coach ===
On 27 October 2014, Fabrice Santoro was named the Aces' first coach.

=== Inaugural season ===
On 28 November 2014, the Aces defeated the Singapore Slammers, 26–16, in the first match in IPTL history. Rohan Bopanna served the first point of the league's inaugural match.

They went on to be the champion of the 2014 International Premier Tennis League

== Television coverage ==
On 16 October 2014, IPTL announced it had reached an agreement for the Indian television broadcasting rights with STAR Sports.

== Sponsorship ==
According to the Aces' website, Micromax was the team's title sponsor in the 2014 edition.

== Roster ==
As of 27 November 2016

- (Switzerland) Roger Federer
- (Spain) Feliciano López
- (India) Rohan Bopanna
- (Canada) Eugenie Bouchard
- (India) Sania Mirza
- (Sweden) Thomas Enqvist
- (Australia) Mark Philippoussis
- (Croatia) Ivan Dodig
