= International Premier Tennis League =

Annual team tennis league

- Sport: Team tennis
- Founded: 2013
- Founder: Mahesh Bhupathi
- First season: 2014
- Folded: 2016
- Director: Mahesh Bhupathi
- Motto: Break the Code
- No. of teams: 4 (per season)
- Countries: India; Japan; Philippines; Singapore; United Arab Emirates
- Continent: Asia
- Last champion: Singapore Slammers
- Most titles: Singapore Slammers (2)
- Sponsor: The Coca-Cola Company
- Website: www.iptlworld.com

The International Premier Tennis League (IPTL, officially the Coca-Cola International Premier Tennis League Presented by Qatar Airways pursuant to sponsorship agreements with The Coca-Cola Company and Qatar Airways) was an annual team tennis league that took place in various cities in Asia. Founded in 2013, the elite level exhibition tennis tournament took place for the first time in November 2014. Due to financial issues the tournament was not held in 2017.

== History ==
Original logo of the International Premier Tennis League

Mahesh Bhupathi announced the founding of the International Premier Tennis League on 25 May 2013, in Paris. The initial plan was to start the league with six charter franchises in Asia with the inaugural season commencing in November 2014. Bhupathi said the league would be modeled after the Indian Premier League, a cricket league in India. Justin Gimelstob said that the league would be star-driven as World Team Tennis was in the 1970s.

On 21 January 2014, IPTL announced the locations of the six charter franchises for the league's inaugural season. Five franchises would play their home matches in Bangkok, Hong Kong, Kuala Lumpur, Mumbai and Singapore. A sixth franchise would play its home matches in an undisclosed city in the Middle East. There was confusion surrounding the announcement. Some media outlets reported that there would be five franchises, not six as had been previously announced, and did not include the Hong Kong franchise among the five. Later news reports in February 2014, indicated that there would be five franchises including one based in Hong Kong but not one in the Middle East.

IPTL conducted its inaugural player draft on 2 March 2014. Right up until the day before the draft, the media remained under the impression that the Hong Kong and Kuala Lumpur franchises would participate in the league and that the Middle East franchise was doubtful. However, only four teams participated in the draft: Bangkok, Mumbai, Singapore and Middle East now referred to as the Dubai franchise. No mention was made by IPTL of the Hong Kong and Kuala Lumpur franchises which had abruptly disappeared.

By May 2014, the Dubai franchise was being referred to as the UAE Falcons, the Mumbai franchise had been named the Indian Aces, and the Singapore franchise was being referred to as the Singapore Lions.

On 10 May 2014, IPTL announced that the Bangkok franchise would be moved to Manila, Philippines due to political unrest in Thailand.

On 19 June 2014, an IPTL press release revealed the owners of the four franchises to the general public. The owner of the Indian franchise, Micromax Informatics Ltd. proved to be the reason the team was no longer called the Mumbai franchise, because it preferred to have the team play its home matches in New Delhi. A group called PVP Ventures led by entrepreneur Prasad V Potluri and cricket legend Sachin Tendulkar had been the original franchise owners with a plan to play home matches in Mumbai. While league managing director Bhupathi said PVP Ventures had been replaced by Micromax, because PVP missed a payment deadline, PVP said it had withdrawn from the league due to lack of clarity over how IPTL's business model was progressing and disagreements over player contracts. PVP did not want the team to be solely responsible for payment of player salaries and favored the league being obligated as well.

By June 2014, the Manila franchise had been named the Manila Mavericks, the Falcons had become the UAE Royals and the Lions had become the Singapore Slammers.

The IPTL was not held in 2017 after 3 seasons of the tennis league due to financial issues. The number of legs was reduced to three from the previous five for the 2016 season and the league was not able to secure players, Roger Federer and Serena Williams. It was planned that the following season of the IPTL would be hosted in a single country.

In 2018, Broadcast Sports News accused founder Mahesh Bhupathi of non-payment of dues to the IPTL's stakeholders. Bhupathi confirmed the non-payment but added that the Legendari group which is behind the Japan Warriors team which joined the IPTL in 2016 was largely responsible for the leagues' financial crisis alleging the group of committing fraud.

== Teams ==
Team	Location	Arena	Capacity	Joined	Last season
Indian Aces	Hyderabad, India	Gachibowli Indoor Stadium	5,000	2014	2016
Japan Warriors	Saitama, Japan	Saitama Super Arena	36,500	2015	2016
Manila/Philippine Mavericks	Pasay, Philippines	Mall of Asia Arena	15,000	2014	2015
Singapore Slammers	Singapore	Singapore Indoor Stadium	12,000	2014	2016
UAE Royals	Dubai, United Arab Emirates	Dubai Duty Free Stadium	5,000	2014	2016

== Competition format ==
All IPTL matches conform to the rules of tennis and code of conduct laid down by the International Tennis Federation. A match comprises five sets each of a different category as follows:

- Men's singles
- Women's singles
- Men's doubles
- Mixed doubles
- Past champions' singles

The order of play is decided by the coach of the home team. If two teams are playing at a neutral site, then a coin toss determines which coach chooses the order of play. The first serve in the first set is determined by a coin toss. The team that served last in the last game or tiebreaker of the previous set will receive during the next set.

Each team can call a power point once in each set when receiving serve, and the next point played will count double. Effectively, a player trailing 15–0 can directly get to 15–30 by winning the power point.

Games are played to four points using no-ad scoring. Each game won by a player or doubles team adds one point to the team's score in the match. The team with the most points at the end of the five sets wins the match. Each set is won when a team is the first to reach six games won. If the score is five-games-all, a timed five-minute shoot-out will be played. The player or doubles team leading at the end of five minutes wins the set.

If the team that wins the fifth set is leading the match, the match is over. If the score is tied after one team has won the fifth set, a timed seven-minute men's singles super shoot-out is played. The result counts as a game point won. If the team that wins the fifth set is trailing in the match, the match will go to sudden-death overtime effectively extending the fifth set. If the leading team wins one game in overtime, it wins the match tie. If the trailing team wins enough games in overtime to tie the match score without losing a game, a timed seven-minute men's singles super shoot-out is played to decide the winner of the match tie. A coin toss decides who serves first in super shoot-outs.

During IPTL matches, a shot clock keeps track of the countdown between points and during the change overs. There will be a maximum of 20 seconds between each game point and a maximum of three minutes between each set.

Each team can call for a coach's time out once during each set. Each time out is limited to a maximum duration of 60 seconds.

Each team can make one player substitution per set except a team with the overall match lead in the final set. If a player on a team with the overall match lead gets injured during the fifth set, he or she cannot be replaced. The team trailing in the match is credited with enough games won to tie the overall match score and send it to a super shoot-out. Players removed from a set for a substitute may play in later sets in the match.

The team that wins a match tie has four points added to its total in the team standings. If the losing team accumulates at least 20 game points, it receives two points in the team standings. If the losing team accumulates at least 10 but less than 20 game points, it receives one point in the team standings. Losing teams that earn less than 10 game points do not receive any points in the team standings.

The team with the most points throughout the season is declared the IPTL champion. In the event that two or more teams share the highest points on the final tally, the criteria to decide the champion are

1. Head-to-head results
2. Number of games won
3. Number of games lost
4. Biggest games margin in any single match win
5. Coin toss

The IPTL champions will receive the IPTL Challenge Trophy along with a grand prize of US$1,000,000.

== Seasons ==
=== 2014 season ===
IPTL started its inaugural season on 28 November 2014, with the Indian Aces defeating the Singapore Slammers, 26–16, in Pasay, Metro Manila, Philippines. Rohan Bopanna served the first point of the league's inaugural match.

On 30 November, the Aces defeated the UAE Royals in Pasay, 28–20, in a matchup of two previously unbeaten teams to move into first place in the standings at the end of the league's Philippines wing.

The Indian Aces were declared the champions of the inaugural season on the final day with overall 2 points lead over the runners-up UAE Royals.

=== 2016 season ===
For the 2016 season, only 4 teams from the previous 5 participated. The UAE Royals, one of the participating teams, did not play any games in their country.

== Television coverage ==
On 22 August 2014, IPTL announced it had reached an agreement for the Middle East and North Africa television broadcasting rights with Abu Dhabi Media. On 16 October 2014, IPTL announced that STAR Sports would broadcast the league's matches live in both standard definition and high definition in India during its inaugural 2014 season. The league's matches will also be available live on STAR Sports's website. On 4 November 2014, Integrated Sports Media announced it had reached a deal with IPTL to televise every league match of the 2014 season on a pay-per-view basis in the United States. On 7 November 2014, IPTL announced it had reached agreements on television broadcast contracts with ABS-CBN in the Philippines and SingTel in Singapore. The league also said there would be television coverage of its matches in the United Kingdom, France, Italy, the Czech Republic, Serbia, Southeast Asia, Sub-Saharan Africa, Latin America and Brazil. In total, television coverage of IPTL matches will be available in more than 125 countries worldwide and reach over 300 million households. Starting in the 2015 season, ESPN will broadcast the IPTL to the Spanish-speaking Latin American and English-speaking Caribbean countries. On November 9, 2015, IPTL went into one-year broadcast agreement with Philippine sports broadcaster Sports5 for the online and television airing of the games.

== Sponsorship ==
The IPTL announced it has secured sponsorship from at least two companies in November 2014; The Coca-Cola Company as the league's title sponsor. and Qatar Airways as the league's presenting sponsor.

== Winners ==
Year	Winner	Icon player	Runner-up	Score	Finals surface	City
2014	(India) Indian Aces	(Switzerland) Roger Federer	(United Arab Emirates) UAE Royals	No final		
2015	Singapore Slammers	(United Kingdom) Andy Murray	(India) Indian Aces	26–20	Singapore Indoor Stadium (Hard)	Singapore
2016	Singapore Slammers (2)	(Australia) Nick Kyrgios	(India) Indian Aces	30–14	Gachibowli Indoor Stadium (Hard)	Hyderabad, India

== See also ==
- Odisha Tennis Premier League
- Champions Tennis League
- World TeamTennis
