= 2014 Singapore Slammers season =

2014 event

2014 Singapore Slammers
- 2014 record: 3 wins, 9 losses
- Home record: 2 wins, 1 loss
- Road record: 1 win, 2 losses
- Neutral-site record: 6 losses
- Games won: 240
- Games lost: 315
- Owner(s): Sunil Gavaskar; Kishan Gehlot; Shashi Kiran Shetty; Ajay Sethi
- President/CEO: Vikas Gehlot
- Coach: Joshua Eagle
- Stadium: Singapore Indoor Stadium
- Avg. home attendance: 8,000
- Television coverage: SingTel

The 2014 Singapore Slammers season (officially the 2014 DBS Singapore Slammers season pursuant to a sponsorship agreement with DBS Bank Ltd) is the inaugural season of the franchise playing in the International Premier Tennis League (IPTL).

== Season recap ==
=== Founding of franchise ===
On 21 January 2014, IPTL announced that one of the charter franchises for the league's inaugural 2014 season would be in Singapore. The team was founded by Indian cricket legend Sunil Gavaskar and international business executives Kishan Gehlot, Shashi Kiran Shetty and Ajay Sethi. Gehlot is the chairman of East African real estate development and healthcare conglomerate Intex Group. Shetty is chairman of Allcargo Logistics Limited. Sethi is chairman of Channel 2 in Dubai. They collectively invested US$15 million to own the franchise.

=== Inaugural draft ===
The Singapore franchise participated in the IPTL inaugural draft on 2 March 2014, in Dubai, United Arab Emirates. Players selected by Singapore were

| Player | IPTL Category |
|---|---|
Men
| (United States) Andre Agassi | Icon players |
| (Czech Republic) Tomáš Berdych | Category A |
| (Australia) Lleyton Hewitt | Category B |
| (Australia) Patrick Rafter | Past champions |
| (Brazil) Bruno Soares | Doubles players |
| (Australia) Nick Kyrgios | Uncategorized |
Women
| (United States) Serena Williams | Icon players |
| (Slovakia) Daniela Hantuchová | Category C |

=== Team name ===
By May 2014, the team was being referred to as the Singapore Lions. By June 2014, the Lions had become known as the Singapore Slammers.

=== Home venue ===
On 4 August 2014, the Slammers announced that their home matches would be played at Singapore Indoor Stadium.

=== First coach ===
On 27 October 2014, Joshua Eagle was named the Slammers' first coach.

== Event chronology ==
- 21 January 2014: IPTL announced that one of the charter franchises for the league inaugural 2014 season would be in Singapore.
- 2 March: The Singapore franchise participated in the IPTL inaugural draft.
- 10 May: The Singapore franchise was referred to as the Singapore Lions.
- 25 June: The Lions' name is changed to the Singapore Slammers.
- 4 August: The Slammers announced that their home matches would be played at Singapore Indoor Stadium.
- 27 October: Joshua Eagle was named the Slammers' first coach.
- 28 November: The Indian Aces defeated the Slammers 26–16 in the first match in IPTL history.

== Match log ==
| 28 November; L (0–1) | Report | Indian Aces (India) | 26–16 | Singapore Slammers | Mall of Asia Arena, Metro Manila |
| 28 November; L (0–1) | Report | Score by game: | | | Mall of Asia Arena, Metro Manila |
| 28 November; L (0–1) | Report | Sania Mirza / Rohan Bopanna | 6–4 | Daniela Hantuchová / Bruno Soares | Mall of Asia Arena, Metro Manila |
| Fabrice Santoro | | | 6–5 | Pat Rafter |
| Rohan Bopanna / Gaël Monfils | | | 2–6 | Tomáš Berdych / Nick Kyrgios |
| Ana Ivanovic | | | 6–0 | Daniela Hantuchová |
| Gaël Monfils | | | 6–1 | Lleyton Hewitt |
| | | | – |

| 29 November; L (0–2) | Report | Singapore Slammers | 22–28 | (United Arab Emirates) UAE Royals | Mall of Asia Arena, Metro Manila |
| 29 November; L (0–2) | Report | Score by game: | | | Mall of Asia Arena, Metro Manila |
| 29 November; L (0–2) | Report | Tomáš Berdych | 4–6 | Marin Čilić | Mall of Asia Arena, Metro Manila |
| Tomáš Berdych / Nick Kyrgios | | | 6–5 | Marin Čilić / Nenad Zimonjić |
| Daniela Hantuchová | | | 1–6 | Kristina Mladenovic |
| Daniela Hantuchová / Bruno Soares (sub. Nick Kyrgios) | | | 6–5 | Kristina Mladenovic / Nenad Zimonjić |
| Pat Rafter | | | 5–6 | Goran Ivanišević |
| | | | – |

| 30 November; L (0–3) | Report | Manila Mavericks (Philippines) | 27–19 | Singapore Slammers | Mall of Asia Arena, Metro Manila |
| 30 November; L (0–3) | Report | Score by game: | | | Mall of Asia Arena, Metro Manila |
| 30 November; L (0–3) | Report | Mark Philippoussis | 6–2 | Pat Rafter | Mall of Asia Arena, Metro Manila |
| Treat Huey / Jo-Wilfried Tsonga | | | 6–5 | Lleyton Hewitt (sub. Nick Kyrgios) / Tomáš Berdych |
| Kirsten Flipkens / Andy Murray | | | 6–1 | Serena Williams / Lleyton Hewitt |
| Kirsten Flipkens | | | 3–6 | Serena Williams |
| Andy Murray | | | 6–5 | Nick Kyrgios |
| | | | – |

| 2 December; L (0–4) | Report | Singapore Slammers | 21–29 | (Philippines) Manila Mavericks | Singapore Indoor Stadium, Singapore |
| 2 December; L (0–4) | Report | Score by game: | | | Singapore Indoor Stadium, Singapore |
| 2 December; L (0–4) | Report | Andre Agassi | 3–6 | Mark Philippoussis | Singapore Indoor Stadium, Singapore |
| Tomáš Berdych / Lleyton Hewitt | | | 4–6 | Treat Huey / Jo-Wilfried Tsonga |
| Tomáš Berdych | | | 5–6 | Jo-Wilfried Tsonga |
| Serena Williams / Nick Kyrgios | | | 3–6 | Kirsten Flipkens / Daniel Nestor |
| Serena Williams | | | 6–5 | Kirsten Flipkens |
| | | | – |

| 3 December; W (1–4) | Report | Singapore Slammers | 24–23 | (India) Indian Aces | Singapore Indoor Stadium, Singapore |
| 3 December; W (1–4) | Report | Score by game: | | | Singapore Indoor Stadium, Singapore |
| 3 December; W (1–4) | Report | Serena Williams | 6–4 | Ana Ivanovic | Singapore Indoor Stadium, Singapore |
| Serena Williams / Bruno Soares | | | 3–6 | Sania Mirza / Rohan Bopanna |
| Andre Agassi | | | 2–6 | Fabrice Santoro |
| Tomáš Berdych | | | 6–2 | Gaël Monfils |
| Lleyton Hewitt / Nick Kyrgios | | | 6–5 | Rohan Bopanna / Gaël Monfils |
| | | | – |

(Berdych defeated Monfils in the 7-minute Super Shootout)

| 4 December; W (2–4) | Report | Singapore Slammers | 27–25 | (United Arab Emirates) UAE Royals | Singapore Indoor Stadium, Singapore |
| 4 December; W (2–4) | Report | Score by game: | | | Singapore Indoor Stadium, Singapore |
| 4 December; W (2–4) | Report | Serena Williams | 6–5 | Caroline Wozniacki | Singapore Indoor Stadium, Singapore |
| Serena Williams / Tomáš Berdych | | | 6–4 | Kristina Mladenovic / Nenad Zimonjić |
| Pat Rafter | | | 4–6 | Goran Ivanišević |
| Tomáš Berdych | | | 6–4 | Marin Čilić |
| Lleyton Hewitt / Nick Kyrgios | | | 5–6 | Marin Čilić / Nenad Zimonjić |
| | | | – |

| 6 December; L (2–5) | Report | UAE Royals (United Arab Emirates) | 29–16 | Singapore Slammers | Indira Gandhi Indoor Stadium, New Delhi |
| 6 December; L (2–5) | Report | Score by game: | | | Indira Gandhi Indoor Stadium, New Delhi |
| 6 December; L (2–5) | Report | Marin Čilić | 6–3 | Lleyton Hewitt | Indira Gandhi Indoor Stadium, New Delhi |
| Marin Čilić / Nenad Zimonjić | | | 6–2 | Lleyton Hewitt / Nick Kyrgios |
| Goran Ivanišević | | | 6–1 | Pat Rafter |
| Kristina Mladenovic / Nenad Zimonjić | | | 6–4 | Daniela Hantuchová / Nick Kyrgios |
| Caroline Wozniacki | | | 5–6 | Daniela Hantuchová |
| | | | – |

| 7 December; L (2–6) | Report | Indian Aces (India) | 26–16 | Singapore Slammers | Indira Gandhi Indoor Stadium, New Delhi |
| 7 December; L (2–6) | Report | Score by game: | | | Indira Gandhi Indoor Stadium, New Delhi |
| 7 December; L (2–6) | Report | Pete Sampras | 2–6 | Pat Rafter | Indira Gandhi Indoor Stadium, New Delhi |
| Sania Mirza / Roger Federer | | | 6–0 | Daniela Hantuchová / Bruno Soares |
| Rohan Bopanna / Roger Federer | | | 6–1 | Lleyton Hewitt / Nick Kyrgios |
| Roger Federer | | | 6–4 | Tomáš Berdych |
| Ana Ivanovic | | | 6–5 | Daniela Hantuchová |
| | | | – |

| 8 December; L (2–7) | Report | Manila Mavericks (Philippines) | 23–17 | Singapore Slammers | Indira Gandhi Indoor Stadium, New Delhi |
| 8 December; L (2–7) | Report | Score by game: | | | Indira Gandhi Indoor Stadium, New Delhi |
| 8 December; L (2–7) | Report | Jo-Wilfried Tsonga | 6–2 | Tomáš Berdych | Indira Gandhi Indoor Stadium, New Delhi |
| Kirsten Flipkens / Daniel Nestor | | | 3–6 | Daniela Hantuchová / Nick Kyrgios |
| Kirsten Flipkens | | | 2–6 | Daniela Hantuchová |
| Daniel Nestor / Jo-Wilfried Tsonga | | | 6–0 | Lleyton Hewitt / Nick Kyrgios |
| Mark Philippoussis | | | 6–3 | Pat Rafter |
| | | | – |

| 11 December; L (2–8) | Report | Indian Aces (India) | 28–24 | Singapore Slammers | Hamdan Sports Complex, Dubai |
| 11 December; L (2–8) | Report | Score by game: | | | Hamdan Sports Complex, Dubai |
| 11 December; L (2–8) | Report | Ana Ivanovic | 6–5 | Daniela Hantuchová | Hamdan Sports Complex, Dubai |
| Fabrice Santoro | | | 6–3 | Pat Rafter |
| Sania Mirza / Rohan Bopanna | | | 6–5 | Daniela Hantuchová / Bruno Soares |
| Rohan Bopanna / Gaël Monfils | | | 6–3 | Lleyton Hewitt / Bruno Soares |
| Gaël Monfils | | | 4–8 (OT) | Tomáš Berdych |
| | | | – |

| 12 December; W (3–8) | Report | UAE Royals (United Arab Emirates) | 21–23 | Singapore Slammers | Hamdan Sports Complex, Dubai |
| 12 December; W (3–8) | Report | Score by game: | | | Hamdan Sports Complex, Dubai |
| 12 December; W (3–8) | Report | Kristina Mladenovic | 1–6 | Daniela Hantuchová | Hamdan Sports Complex, Dubai |
| Goran Ivanišević | | | 6–1 | Pat Rafter |
| Kristina Mladenovic / Nenad Zimonjić | | | 6–4 | Daniela Hantuchová / Bruno Soares |
| Marin Čilić / Nenad Zimonjić | | | 3–6 | Lleyton Hewitt / Nick Kyrgios |
| Novak Djokovic | | | 5–6 | Tomáš Berdych |
| | | | – |

| 13 December; L (3–9) | Report | Manila Mavericks (Philippines) | 30–15 | Singapore Slammers | Hamdan Sports Complex, Dubai |
| 13 December; L (3–9) | Report | Score by game: | | | Hamdan Sports Complex, Dubai |
| 13 December; L (3–9) | Report | Mark Philippoussis | 6–5 | Pat Rafter | Hamdan Sports Complex, Dubai |
| Philipp Kohlschreiber | | | 6–2 | Tomáš Berdych |
| Kirsten Flipkens / Daniel Nestor | | | 6–1 | Daniela Hantuchová / Nick Kyrgios |
| Philipp Kohlschreiber / Daniel Nestor | | | 6–4 | Lleyton Hewitt / Bruno Soares |
| Kirsten Flipkens | | | 6–3 | Daniela Hantuchová |
| | | | – |

== Roster ==
- (United States) Andre Agassi
- (Czech Republic) Tomáš Berdych
- (Slovakia) Daniela Hantuchová
- (Australia) Lleyton Hewitt
- (Australia) Nick Kyrgios
- (Australia) Patrick Rafter
- (Brazil) Bruno Soares
- (United States) Serena Williams
- (Australia) Joshua Eagle - Coach

== Television coverage ==
Television coverage in Singapore of Slammers matches will be provided by SingTel.

== Sponsorship ==
On 20 November 2014, DBS Bank Ltd announced that it had become the Slammers' title sponsor.
