= Shashi Kiran =

Shashi Kiran may refer to:

- Shashi Kiran (actor), an Indian actor
- Shashi Kiran Shetty, an Indian businessman
