= Fukuyama Transporting =

Fukuyama Transporting Co., Ltd.
- Logo of Fukuyama Transporting

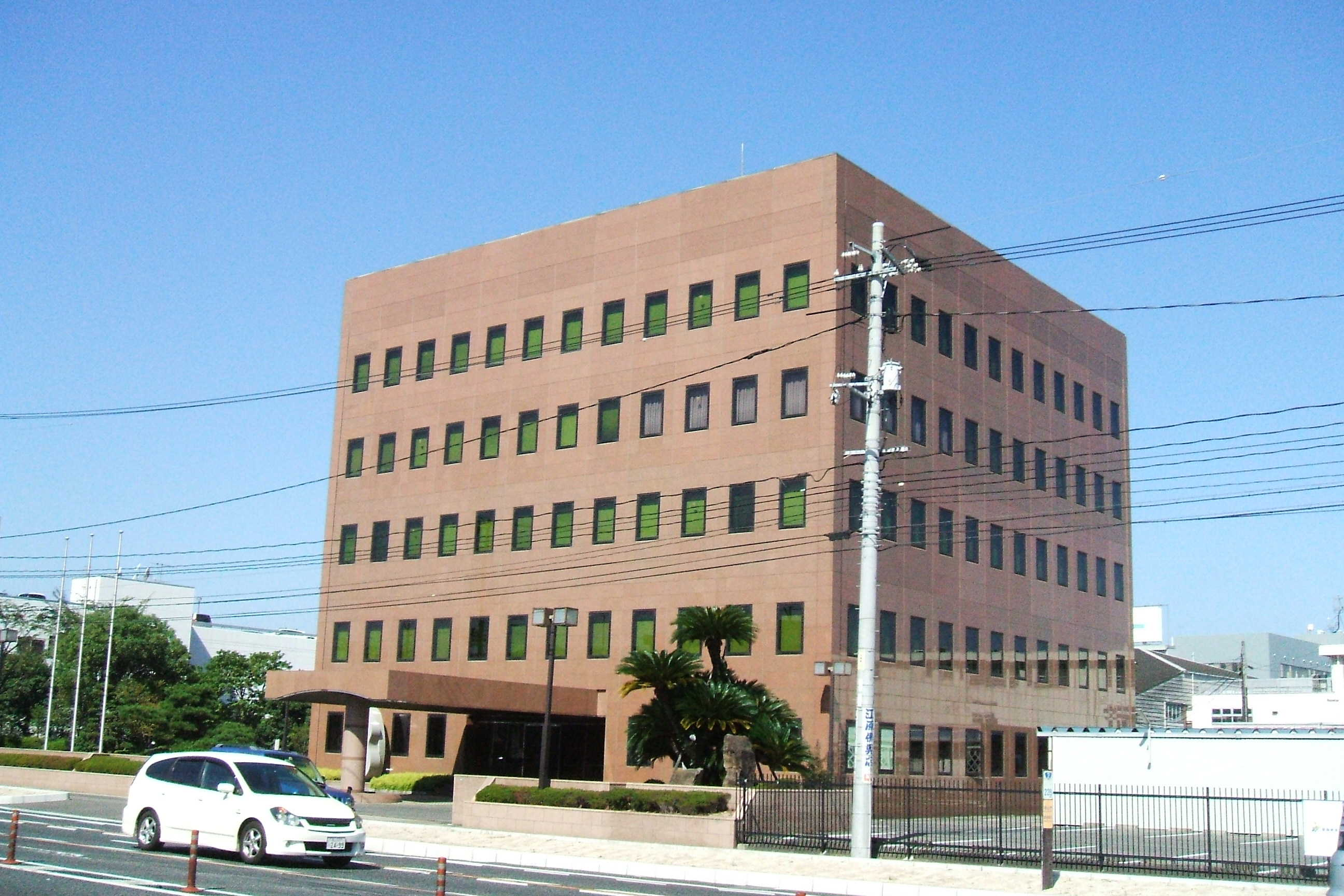
- Fukuyama Transporting headquarters as of 2009
- Native name: 福山通運株式会社
- Formerly: 福山貨物運送株式会社
- Company type: Public (K.K)
- Traded as: TYO: 9075
- Industry: Shipping
- Founded: September 13, 1948; 77 years ago in Fukuyama, Hiroshima, Japan
- Founder: Noboru Shibuya
- Headquarters: Fukuyama, Hiroshima, Japan
- Number of locations: 399 (2011)
- Key people: Shigehiro Komaru (chairman and CEO)
- Services: Multimodal transport; Warehousing; Logistics; Port operations; Customs clearance
- Total assets: ¥30.31 billion (2014)
- Number of employees: 23,391 (including group companies)
- Parent: Kintetsu Group Holdings
- Divisions: Transportation; Distributive Processing; International
- Website: corp.fukutsu.co.jp

Fukuyama Transporting (福山通運, Fukuyama tsūun) is a Kintetsu Group shipping company whose headquarters is in Higashi-Fukatsucho, Fukuyama, Hiroshima. It is listed on the first section of the Tokyo Stock Exchange. It is in a joint partnership with Hitachi Transport System, and deals in parcel shipping and moving.

== Overview ==
It was founded as Fukuyama Freight Transport Co., Ltd. (福山貨物運送) in 1948 in Fukuyama, Hiroshima when a shipping company that closed down transferred the facilities of its Fukuyama branch office to the new company. The founder and company president was Noboru Shibuya, who also founded Shibuya Group (渋谷組), which later became Fukuyama Real Estate (福山地所), and is now Vessel. In 1950, after expanding into transportation services based out of Fukuyama Station, the company name was changed to Fukuyama Transporting, Co., Ltd. It was listed on the first section of the Tokyo Stock Exchange. After founding the company, Noboru Shibuya spent 22 years until his death growing it into a shipping company with a network all over Japan. In 1960 it partnered with and came under the umbrella of Kintetsu Railway.

The company's double circle badge means "trucks ascending with the Sun", and the left and right arrows mean "routes and operations always developing". The green lines painted on the trucks mean "youth" and the red ones mean "burning passion".

Fundamentally they handle corporate packages, and they have been operating a Japan-wide delivery service called "Parcel One" since January 2001 that is cheaper than regular express delivery services (as of February 27, 2015 the Parcel One service is limited to corporate bodies).

== History ==
- September 13, 1948 – Foundation of Fukuyama Freight Transport, Co. Ltd.
- August 1950 – Trade name changed to Fukuyama Transporting, Co., Ltd.
- August 1960 – Capital tie-up with Kintetsu Railway.
- November 1970 – Listed on the second section of the Tokyo Stock Exchange, the second section of the Osaka Securities Exchange, and the Hiroshima Stock Exchange.
- August 1972 – Change of designation to the first section of the Tokyo Stock Exchange and to the first section of the Osaka Securities Exchange.
- October 1, 2009 – Oji Transporting becomes a subsidiary.
- January 7, 2012 – Mimune Co., Ltd (now Fukuyama Global Solutions) becomes a subsidiary.
- July 2, 2012 – Acquires 74% of stocks in Kinukawaya Transport (Chuo-ku, Tokyo) and turns it into a wholly owned subsidiary the same day.
- April 1, 2015- Becomes a Kintetsu Group Holdings affiliated company accounted for by the equity method.
- April 13, 2018 – Acquires 51% of stocks in Kitazawa Co., Ltd., and simultaneously announces a capital tie-up and business partnership with it.

== Branch offices ==
It has about 400 offices in major cities and regions in Japan. Offices in the Greater Tokyo Area, Tōkai region, Kansai region, and San'yō region are directly managed (other regional offices are affiliated subsidiaries).

== Vehicles ==
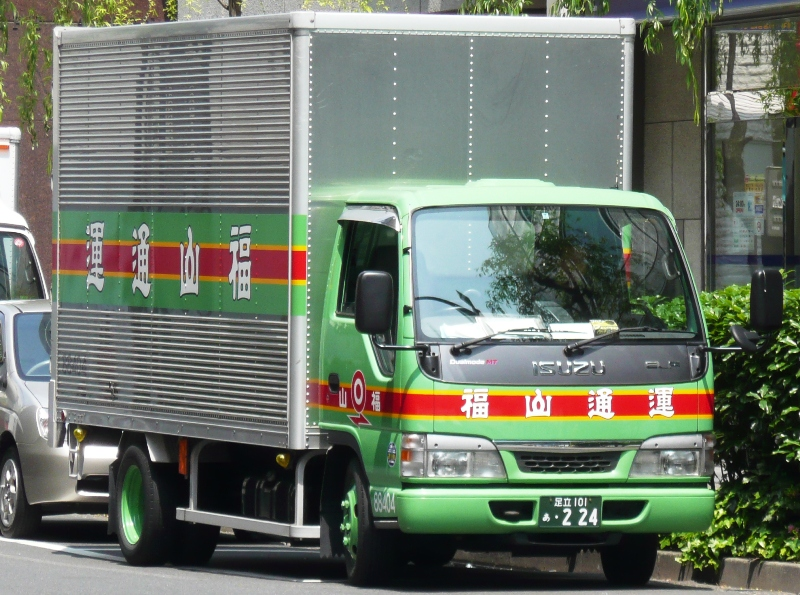
A Fukuyama Transporting truck (Isuzu Elf)

The trucks are mainly made by Isuzu, and large trucks down to small trucks for express delivery use are deployed. For small trucks, the Mitsubishi Fuso Canter is used. Kintetsu Group also has a deep connection with Hino Motors. From 2012 large trucks made by Hino were reintroduced (they had been purchased in the past). Trucks made by Toyota and UD Trucks equipped with Hino engines are used. The coating uses green as a base, and yellow and red lines are inserted. "福山通運" (Fukuyama Transporting) is painted on the front, and "札幌← →沖縄" (Sapporo← →Okinawa) was formerly written as well. Some 2 ton and 4 ton box trucks are equipped with a power deck, which moves the bed of the truck. In recent years they have cooperated with the city of Fukuyama, where the company was founded, on sightseeing efforts. Besides putting stickers reading "The Town of Roses – Fukuyama" on the rear doors, for trucks in the Tokyo Metropolitan Area, from 2015 there are also stickers of "Rola", Fukuyama City's mascot.

== See also ==
- Kintetsu World Express
- StarFlyer - contracted for air freight between Kanto and Kitakyushu.
