= Allcargo Gati =

Indian Courier company

Allcargo Gati Limited
- Former Logo Since 2026 July 31 2026
- Type: Public
- ISIN: INE152B01027
- Industry: Logistics; Supply chain management
- Founded: 1989; 37 years ago
- Defunct: July 31 2026; 10 months ago
- Headquarters: Hyderabad, Telangana, India
- Number of locations: 1300 remote locations through 340 branches (2026)
- Area served: India
- Key people: Shashi Kiran Shetty (Chairman and Managing Director); Pirojshaw Sarkari (CEO); Anish Mathew (CFO)
- Revenue: ▲₹1,505.24 crore (US$160 million) (2022); ₹1,324.65 crore (US$140 million) (2021)
- Operating income: ▲₹49.69 crore (US$5.2 million) (2022); ₹37.56 crore (US$3.9 million) (2021)
- Net income: ▲₹−4.43 crore (US$−460,000) (2022); ₹−245.93 crore (US$−26 million) (2021)
- Total assets: ▼₹681.27 crore (US$71 million) (2022); ₹714.45 crore (US$74 million) (2021)
- Owner: Allcargo Logistics (47.3%); Mukul Mahavir Agrawal (5.12%); Kintetsu Group Holdings (3.52%)
- Number of employees: 537 (2024)
- Subsidiaries: Gati-Kintetsu Express Pvt Ltd.; Gati Kausar India Ltd.; Gati Import Export Trading Limited; Gati Asia Pacific Pte. Ltd.
- Website: allcargologistics.com

Allcargo Gati Limited is an Indian logistics company headquartered in Hyderabad, Telangana. It engages in surface and air express logistics, warehousing, supply chain, air freight, and e-commerce services. Founded in 1989, Gati first started operations between Madras (now Chennai) and Madurai.

In 2020, it was acquired by Allcargo Logistics. Shashi Kiran Shetty, chairman and founder of Allcargo Logistics Ltd., currently serves as the chairman. Gati is listed on the National Stock Exchange and Bombay Stock Exchange.

== History ==
=== Early history ===
Gati was founded in 1989 and began providing same-day courier and distribution services and courier management between Chennai and Madurai. The company expanded to Hyderabad, Bangalore (now Bengaluru), Chennai and Hosur within the same year. It became the first company in India to start providing the delivery date on the docket and started offering a money back guarantee. The company was incorporated in 1995 as Gati Corporation Ltd.

=== 1996–2000 ===
Began offering multi-modal services, courier services and international operations to SAARC countries

=== 2001–2008: Growth and expansion ===
Launched Vehicle Tracking System, a centralised computer system to manage people, packages and vehicles in real time

Created a centralized call centre in Nagpur.

=== 2009–2012 ===
Gati signed a joint venture agreement with Kintetsu World Express for their express distribution and supply chain business to form Gati–KWE, which is a subsidiary of Gati.

Introduced its e-commerce logistics services

=== 2020-2023 ===
Acquired by Allcargo Logistics

In October 2023, the company name was changed to Allcargo Gati.

In June 2025, Allcargo Gati launched a 24-hour air delivery service to eight metro cities in India, aiming to strengthen its express logistics network.

The company also became a part of the government-backed Open Network for Digital Commerce (ONDC) to enhance digital last-mile connectivity.
