= Manoj Tiwari =

Manoj Tiwari or Manoj Tiwary may refer to:

- Manoj Tiwari (Delhi politician) (born 1971), Indian politician, singer, and actor who served as an MP for North East Delhi
- Manoj Tiwari (Uttarakhand politician), Member of the Uttarakhand Legislative Assembly for Almora Assembly constituency
- Manoj Tiwary (cricketer) (born 1985), India and Bengal cricketer; Minister of State for Affairs of Sports and Youth in the West Bengal Assembly
- Manoj Kumar Tiwari (born 1965), chief justice of the Uttarakhand High Court
- Manoj Kumar Tiwari (academic), Indian professor
