= Indian Institute of Management Mumbai =

Indian graduate business school

- Other names: IIM Mumbai, IIM-M
- Former name: National Institute of Industrial Engineering (NITIE)
- Motto: ज्ञानम् जयति सर्वत्र (Sanskrit) transl. Knowledge triumphs everywhere
- Type: Public Business School
- Established: 1963; 63 years ago (as NITIE); 2023; 3 years ago (as IIT Mumbai)
- Accreditation: AACSB, AMBA
- Academic affiliations: Institute of National Importance
- Budget: ₹1,079,776,499 (US$12 million) (2023)
- Chairman: Shashi Kiran Shetty
- Director: Manoj Kumar Tiwari
- Academic staff: 76 (2024)
- Students: 1,130 (2024)
- Postgraduates: 1,026 (2024)
- Doctoral students: 104 (2024)
- Location: Mumbai, Maharastra, India; 19°8′21″N 72°54′18″E
- Campus: 63.832 acres (0.25832 km^{2}); Urban
- Website: iimmumbai.ac.in

The Indian Institute of Management Mumbai (IIM-Mumbai or IIM-M) is a graduate business school under the Ministry of Education (India), Government of India located in Powai near Vihar Lake in Mumbai, Maharashtra. It is ranked 6th among B-Schools of India as per NIRF 2025 rankings.

== History ==
The National Institute for Training in Industrial Engineering, later the National Institute of Industrial Engineering (NITIE), now Indian Institute of Management Mumbai (IIM Mumbai) was established by the Government of India in 1963 with the assistance of United Nations Development Programme (UNDP) through the International Labour Organization (ILO) to create skilled professionals. It was funded by the Government of India and registered as a society under the Societies Registration Act, 1860.

=== Conversion to IIM ===
Noted industrialist Anand Mahindra and HDFC chairman Deepak Parekh had suggested, in 2007, the change in name of NITIE to an IIM, Mumbai. The then Prime Minister Dr Manmohan Singh had promised to look into the issue.

For several years no step was taken in this direction, but on 31 January 2022, the Ministry of Education (India) has constituted a committee of experts to deliberate on the feasibility of bringing the National Institute of Industrial Engineering (NITIE) Mumbai under IIM Act, 2017. The list of experts includes Shri Ashish Kumar Chauhan, MD & CEO, Bombay Stock Exchange & Chancellor University of Allahabad, Prof. Pawan Kumar Singh, Director, IIM Tiruchirappalli, Prof. Pramod Kumar Jain, Director, IIT BHU, Prof. Subhasis Choudhuri, Director, IIT Bombay, Shri Pradeep Goyal, CMD, M/s Pradeep Metals.

A major milestone was achieved by NITIE Mumbai on 12 July 2023 when the Union Cabinet approved the amendment in the IIM Act, designating NITIE Mumbai as the 21st IIM and renaming it as IIM Mumbai.

On July 28, 2023, The Indian Institutes of Management (Amendment) Bill, 2023 was introduced in Lok Sabha by Union education minister Dharmendra Pradhan.

The Indian Institutes of Management (Amendment) Bill, 2023 was passed by Lok Sabha on Aug 4, 2023 It was also passed by Rajya Sabha on 8 August 2023. After receiving the President's assent, the Bill became an Act on Aug 11, 2023.

=== Launch of the Incubation Centre ===
In June 2025, IIM Mumbai established the Atal Incubation Centre–NITIE Incubation Foundation for Innovation and Entrepreneurship (AIC-NIFIE) to promote innovation-driven entrepreneurship. Supported by the Atal Innovation Mission and NITI Aayog, the incubator provides early-stage startups with mentorship, infrastructure, industry linkages, and access to research and funding. Aligned with the institute's emphasis on technology and management, AIC–NIFIE aims to foster a robust entrepreneurial ecosystem both within and beyond the IIM Mumbai community.

== Campus and Infrastructure ==
IIM Mumbai's main campus is located in Powai, in the north-eastern suburbs of Mumbai.

=== Library ===
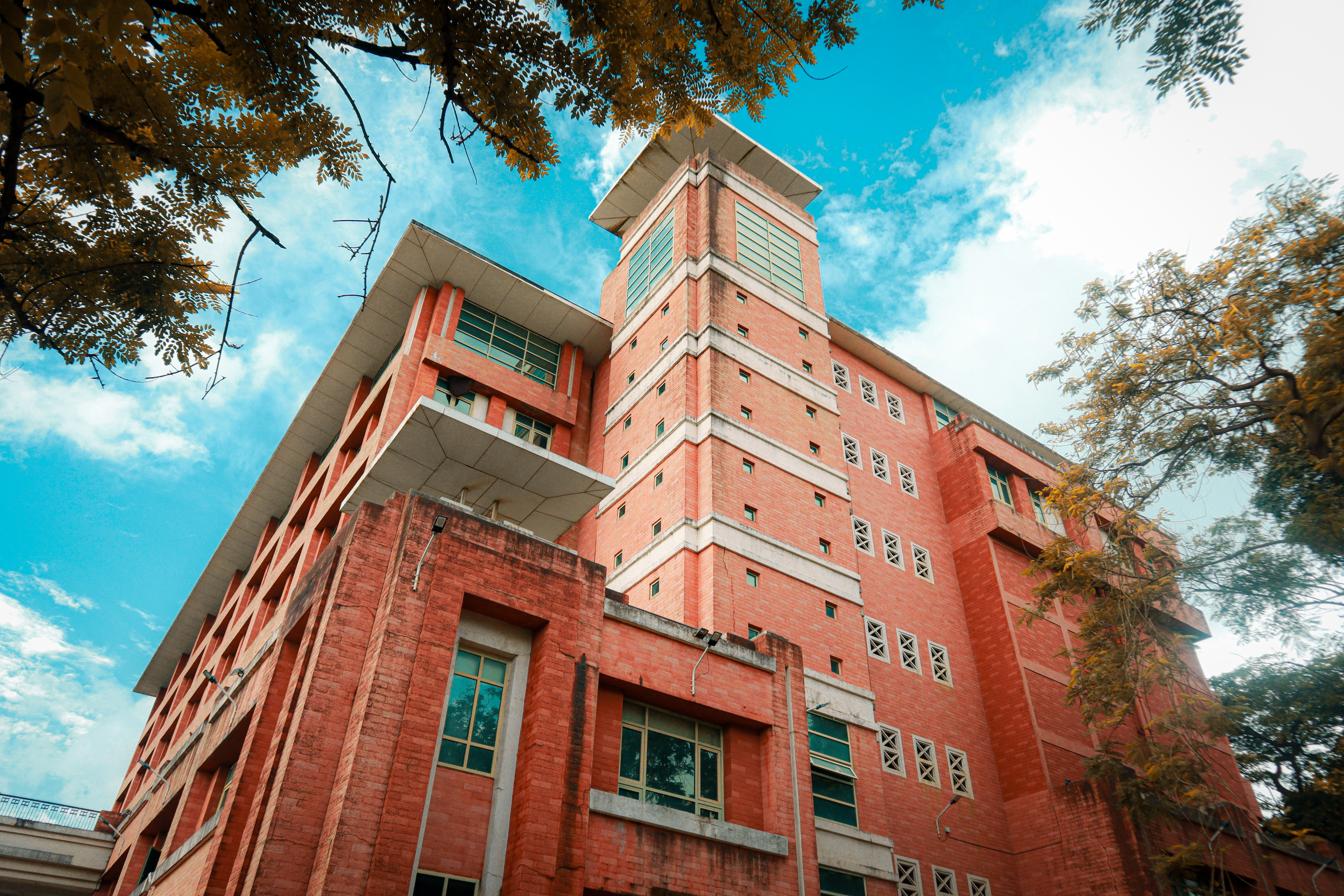
Academic and Library Building

The institute's library relocated in 2016 to a dedicated Academic cum Library Building (ALB), covering approximately 1,434 sq m across three floors.

=== Auditorium ===
An auditorium seating around 200 attendees serves multiple purposes: academic lectures, executive development programs, and more.

=== Sports & Recreation ===
The campus features diverse sports infrastructure, including facilities for badminton (in a dedicated sports complex), basketball, volleyball, cricket, table tennis, carom, and chess.

=== Financial Research and Trading Lab ===
IIM Mumbai maintains a Financial Research and Trading Lab equipped with a Bloomberg Terminal providing students access to real time market data, analytics, and tools for applied financial research and simulations.

=== Other Facilities ===
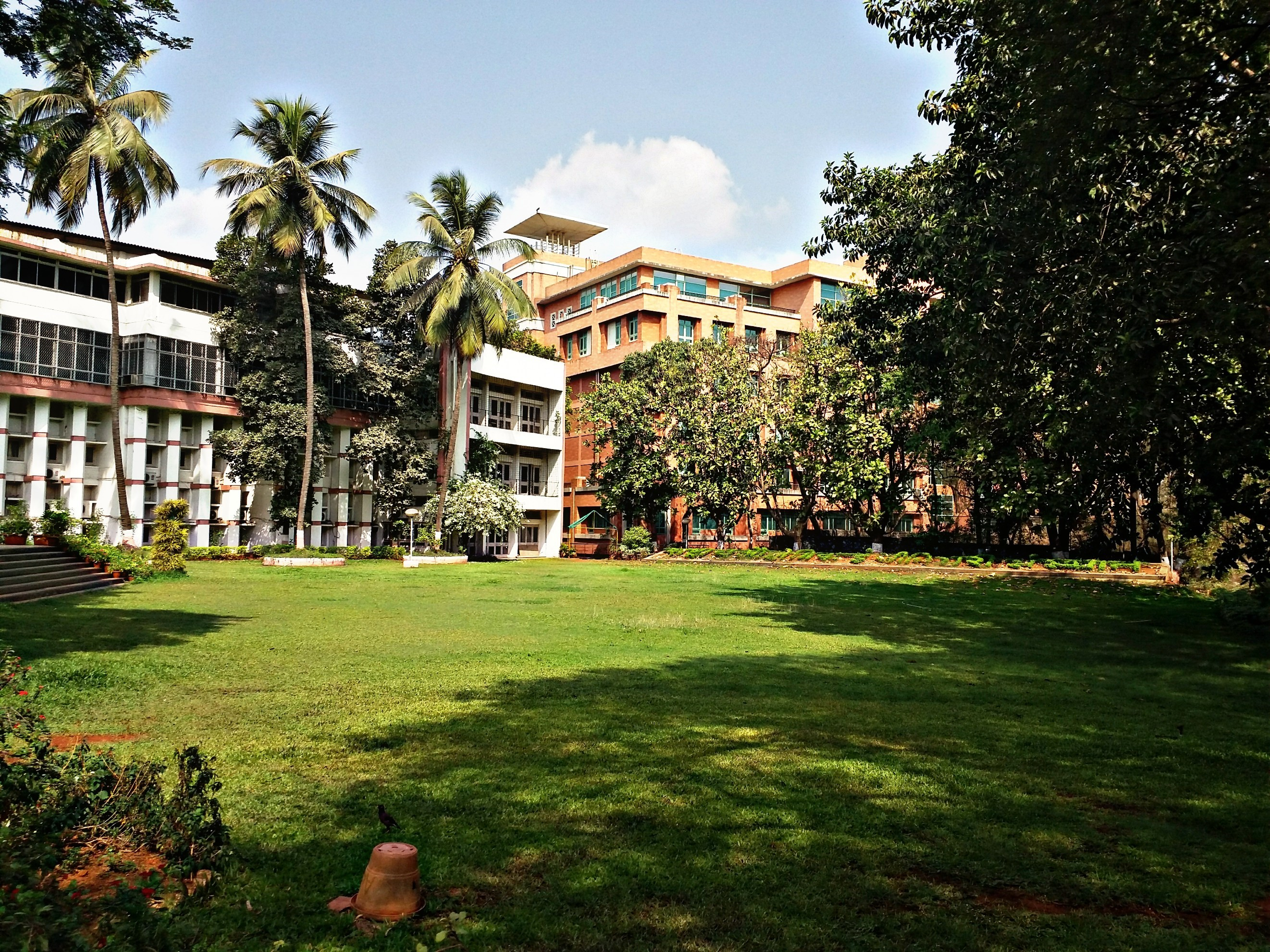
Admin Block

The campus infrastructure includes computer and simulation labs, CAD/CAM and SAP Next-Gen labs, and specialized facilities for engineering and ergonomics. Additional amenities include a gymnasium, guest houses, cafeteria, convenience store, medical dispensary and shuttle services within the campus.

== Academics ==
IIM Mumbai offers management programs, including full-time MBAs in General Management, 'Operations,Wealth Management and Supply Chain Management' and 'Sustainability Management' along with various executive MBA programs tailored for working professionals seeking career advancement. The institute also has a legacy of Postgraduate diplomas in industrial engineering, industrial management (PGDIM), sustainability, information technology management, and financial economics and management (PGDFEM).

It also offers doctoral level fellowship programs. The Fellow Program of IIM Mumbai was started in 1980, since then nearly 100 Fellowship (Doctoral) Degrees have been awarded. Annually, IIM Mumbai trains over 2000 professionals through its various week long Management Development Programs (MDPs) and the unit based programs (UBPs) in different areas of Industrial Engineering & Management.

== Rankings ==
IIM Mumbai is ranked sixth among management schools in India by the National Institutional Ranking Framework (NIRF) in both 2024 and 2025. After rising from its seventh position in 2023, the institute has maintained its position among the country's top business schools.

== Student life ==
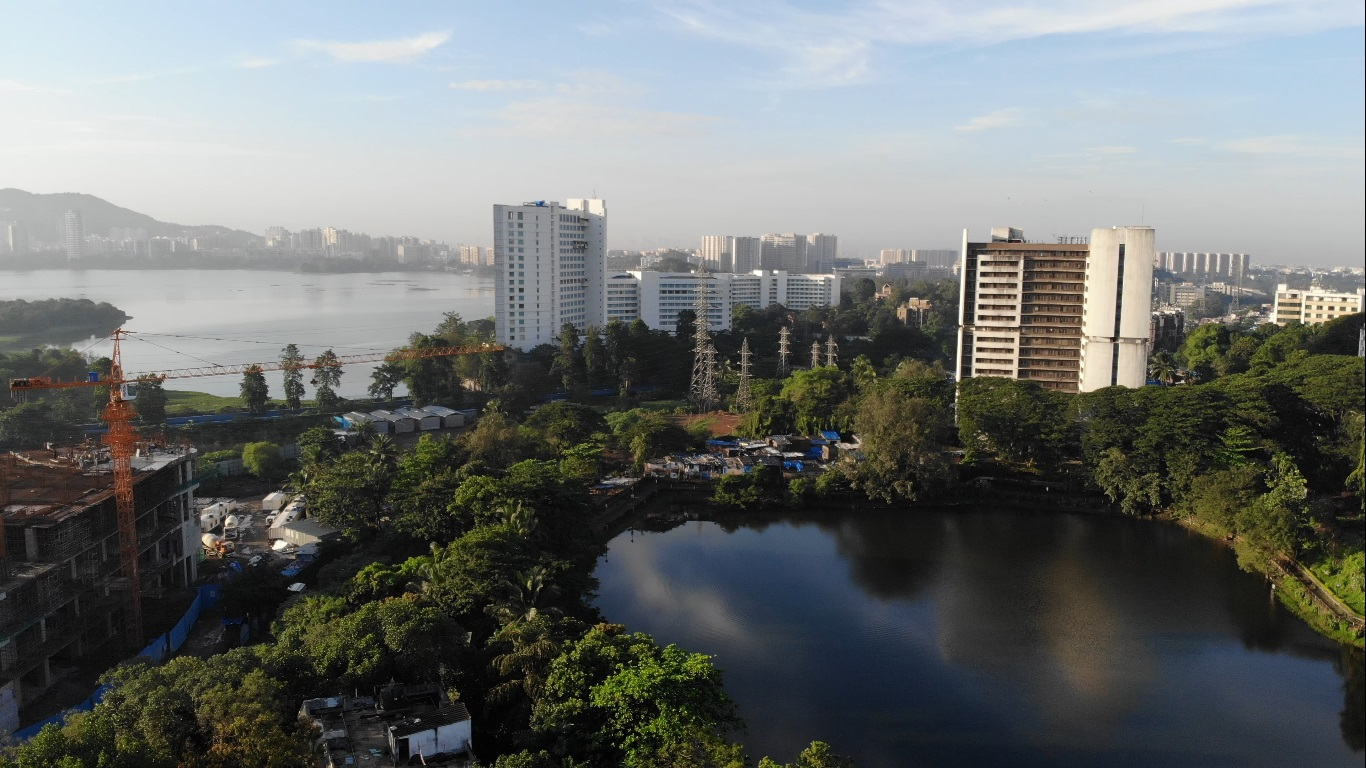
IIM Mumbai Hostel and Lake view

IIM Mumbai is a student-run institute that has around 30 Committees and Forums that the students can be a part of. Around a year, these committees organize various events and programs like Sansmaran – Alumni Meet, Avartan – Flagship Business fest of IIM Mumbai, Mahamandi, Arohan, Panel discussions, Leadership talks, Social Volunteering works etc.

== See also ==
- Indian Institutes of Management
- Institutes of National Importance
- Education in India and Higher education in India
- Common Admission Test (CAT)
