= Miyako Hotels & Resorts =

Headquartered hotels in Tennōji-ku

Kintetsu Miyako Hotels International, Inc.
- Type: Hotels
- Industry: Hospitality
- Founded: 1998 (as a hospitality company)
- Headquarters: Tennōji-ku, Osaka, Japan
- Area served: International
- Key people: Tsutomu Nakayama (President)
- Products: Hotels
- Parent: Kintetsu Group Holdings
- Divisions: Miyako Hotels; Miyako City Hotels; Miyako Resorts
- Website: www.miyakohotels.ne.jp

Miyako Hotels and Resorts (都ホテルズ&リゾーツ) is a chain of hotels headquartered in Tennōji-ku, Osaka, Japan. It is a subsidiary of Kintetsu Group Holdings. As of 5 October 2019, it has 21 properties (opened or announced), including 19 in Japan and two in the United States.

== History ==
Miyako Hotels began as a tea house and Japanese-style garden in Kyoto in 1890. Built by Nihei Nishimura, a wealthy merchant, the first Miyako Hotel was opened ten years later in 1900.

In July 1998, Kintetsu Hotel Systems was established as the hotel's management company.

In March 2000, a merger with the Kintetsu Hotel Systems resulted in Miyako Hotels taking over the management of the 1890-vintage hotel in Kyoto, which was then rebranded as "The Westin Miyako Kyoto".

In April 2007, Starwood acquired the operating rights of the hotels in Osaka and Tokyo.

In March 2014, Miyako Hotels opened Osaka Marriot Miyako Hotel in partnership with Marriott Hotels & Resorts.

On April 1, 2015, Kintetsu Corporation, the parent company of Miyako Hotels, was restructured into a holding company, splitting its railway, real estate, logistics and retail, and recreation service divisions. Miyako Hotels also changed its legal name to Kintetsu Miyako Hotels Co., Ltd. on the same day.

== Brands ==
In August 2018, the company announced its new brands and logos. These brands divided into three categories, Miyako Hotels, Miyako City (Hotels) and Miyako Resorts which took place on April 1, 2019.

== Group hotels ==
=== Miyako Hotels ===
Miyako Hotels is the brand name for luxury hotels by the company.

- Kantō
  - Tokyo
    - Sheraton Miyako Hotel Tokyo (Minato)
- Chūbu
  - Gifu Prefecture
    - Miyako Hotel Gifu Nagaragawa (Gifu)
- Kansai
  - Hyōgo Prefecture
    - Miyako Hotel Amagasaki (Amagasaki)
  - Kyoto Prefecture
    - Miyako Hotel Kyoto Hachijō (Kyoto)
    - The Westin Miyako Kyoto (Kyoto)
  - Osaka Prefecture
    - Sheraton Miyako Hotel Osaka (Osaka)
    - Osaka Marriott Miyako hotel (Osaka)
  - Mie Prefecture
    - Miyako Hotel Yokkaichi (Yokkaichi)
- Kyūshū
  - Fukuoka Prefecture
    - Miyako Hotel Hakata (Fukuoka)

=== Miyako City ===
Miyako City is the brand name for city hotels.

- Kantō
  - Tokyo
    - Miyako City Tokyo Takanawa (Minato)
- Kansai
  - Kyoto Prefecture
    - Miyako City Kintetsu Kyoto Station (Kyoto)
  - Osaka Prefecture
    - Miyako City Osaka Tennōji (Osaka)
    - Miyako City Osaka Hommachi (Osaka) (Scheduled to open in Spring 2020)
  - Mie Prefecture
    - Miyako City Tsu (Tsu)

=== Miyako Resorts ===
Miyako Resorts is the brand name for resort hotels.

- Kansai
  - Mie Prefecture
    - Shima Kanko Hotel The Classic (Shima)
    - Shima Kanko Hotel The Bay Suite (Shima)
    - Shima Kanko Hotel The Club (Shima)
    - Miyako Resort Shima Bay Terrace (Shima)
    - Miyako Resort Okushima Aqua Forest (Shima)

=== Others ===
- Hotel Kintetsu Universal City (Osaka)
- Hotel Shima Spain Village (Shima)
- Kashikojima Hōseikan (ryokan): (Shima)
- Nara Manyō no Yado Mikasa (ryokan): (Nara)

=== Overseas ===
- Los Angeles Miyako Hotel: Los Angeles
- Miyako Hybrid Hotel Torrance California: Torrance, California

== Gallery ==
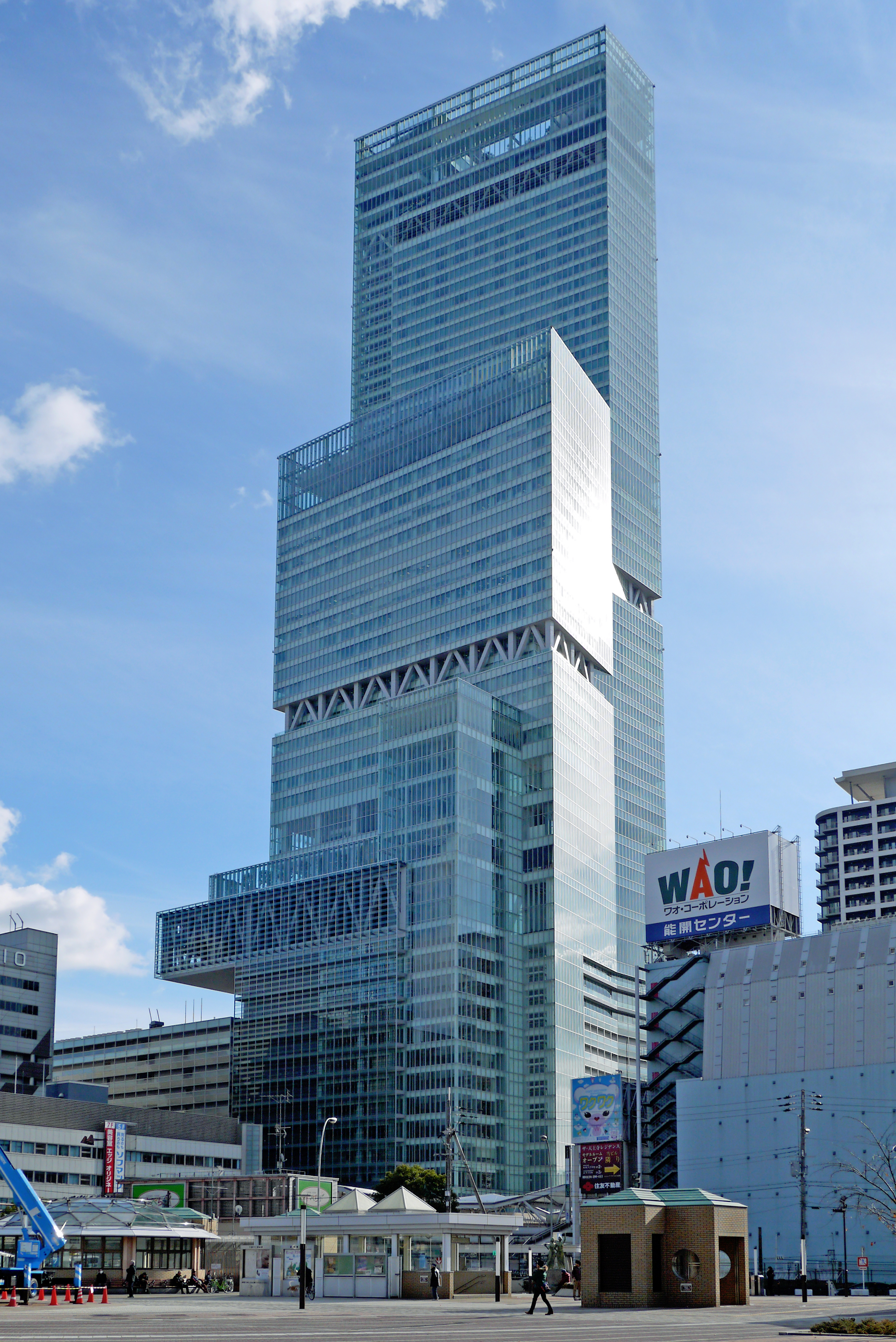
Osaka Marriott Miyako Hotel, incorporating Abenobashi Terminal Building

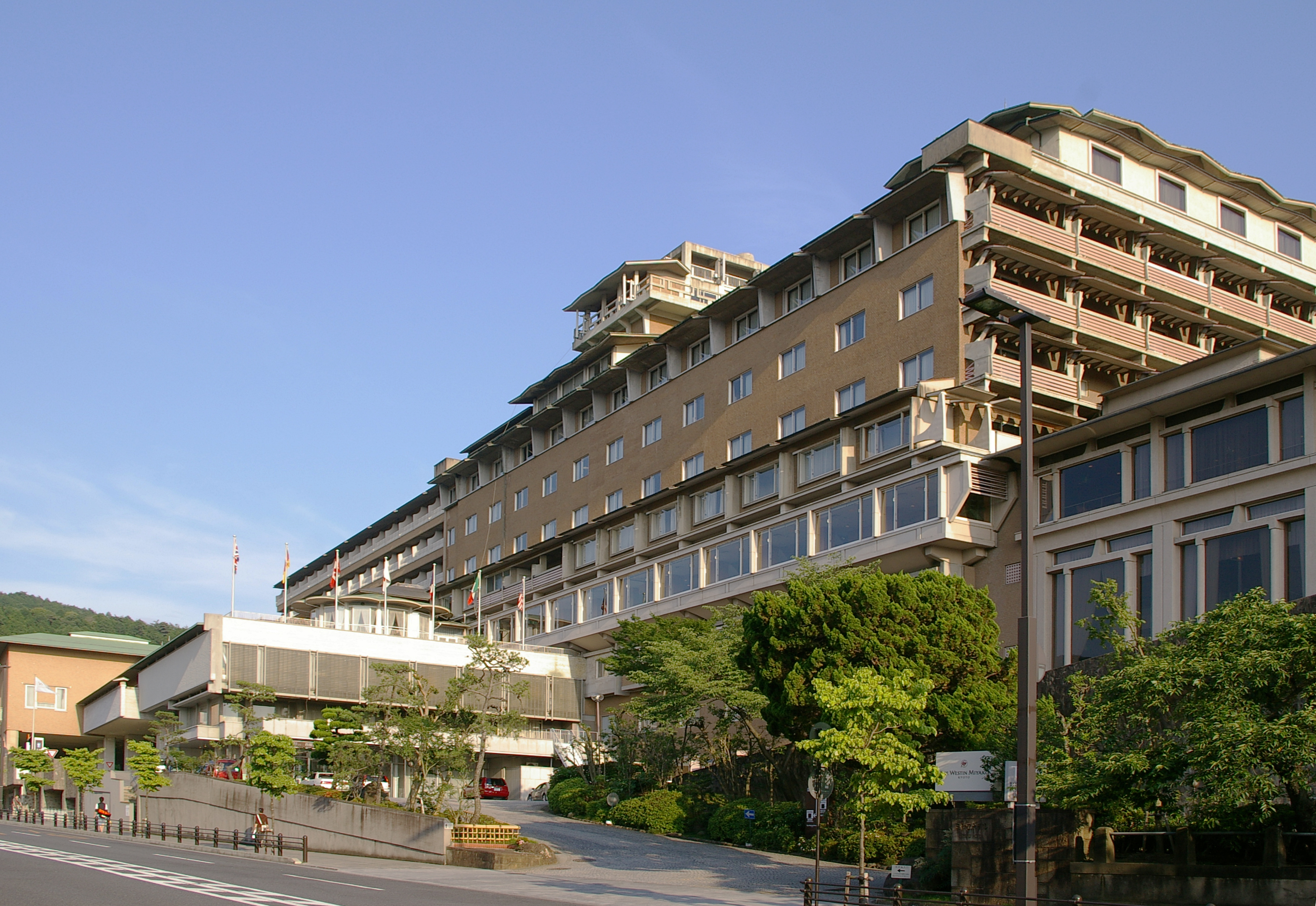
The Westin Miyako Kyoto, Kyoto

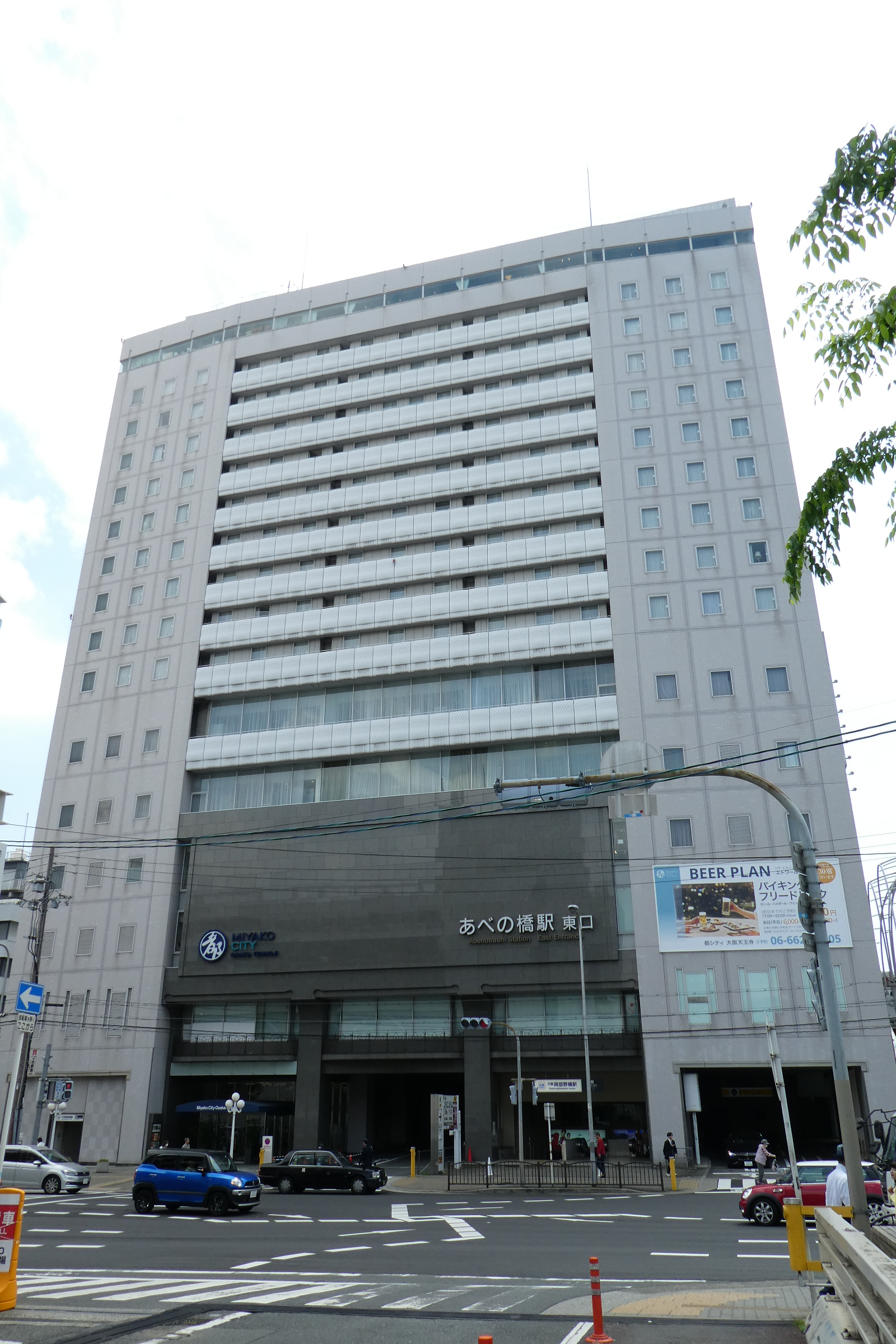
Miyako City Osaka Tennoji, Osaka

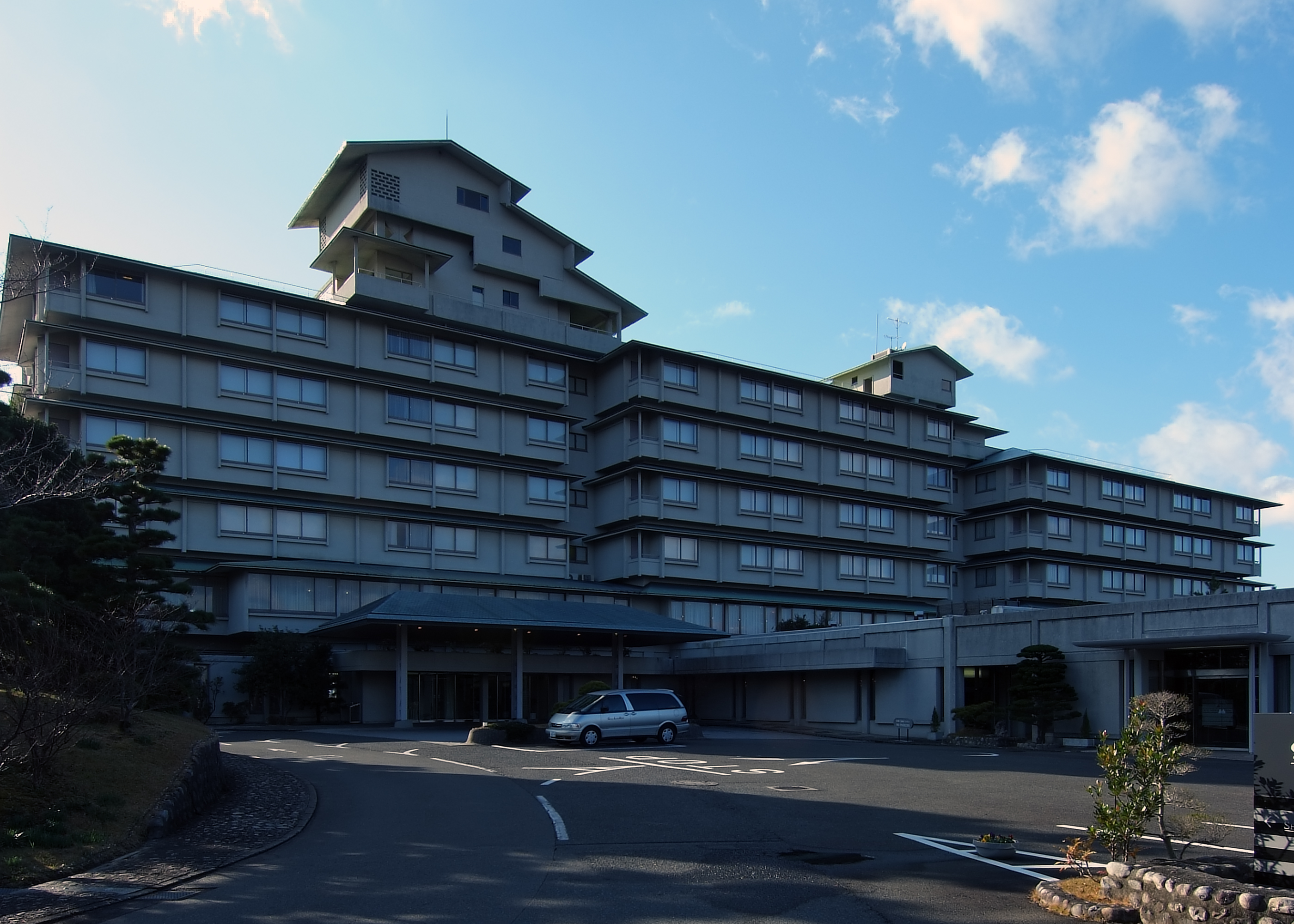
Shima Kanko Hotel The Classic, Shima

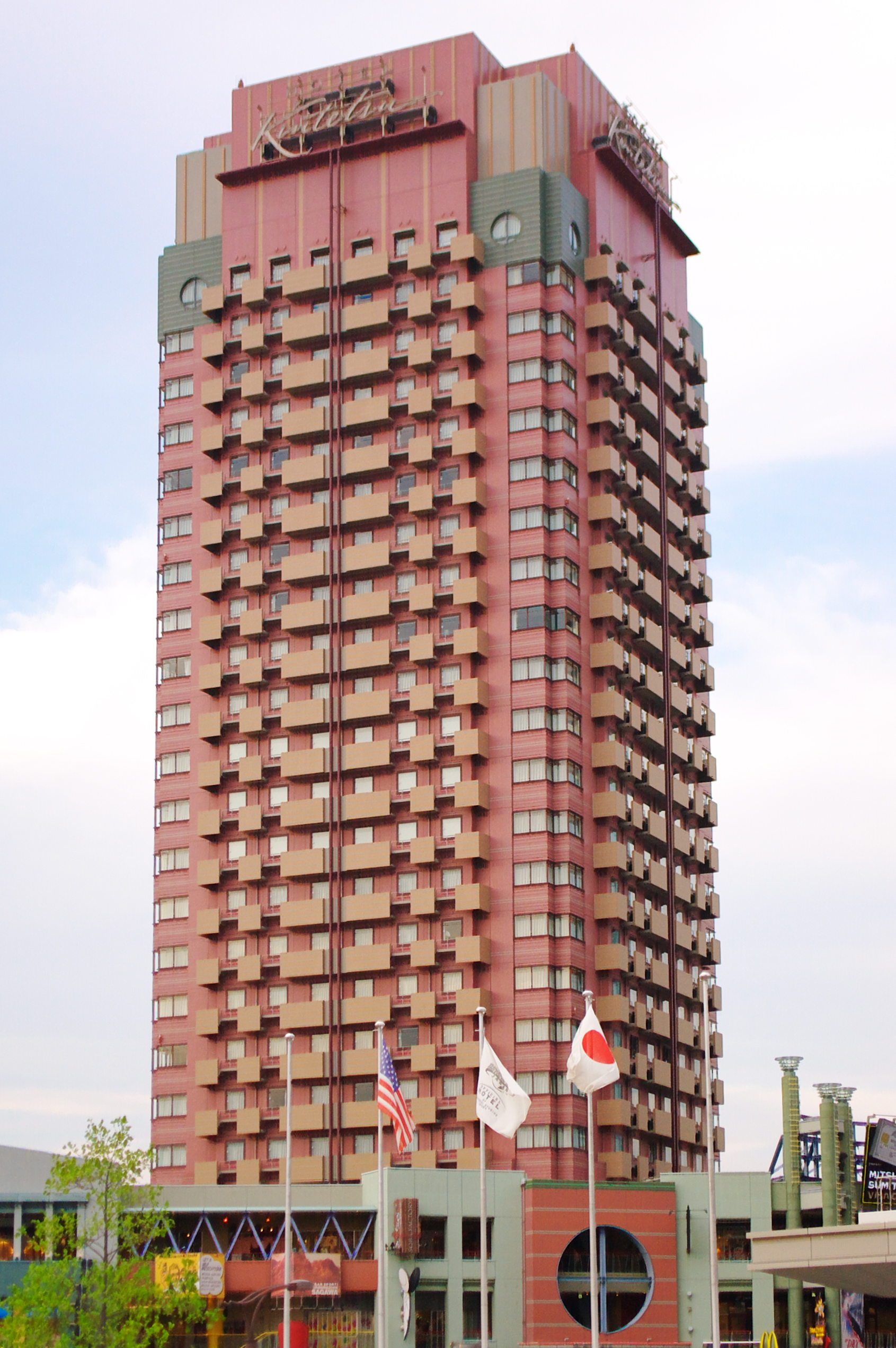
Hotel Kintetsu Universal City, near the Universal Studios Japan

== See also ==
- Kintetsu Group Holdings
