= Kintetsu Bus =

Japanese bus company

Kintetsu Bus Co., Ltd.
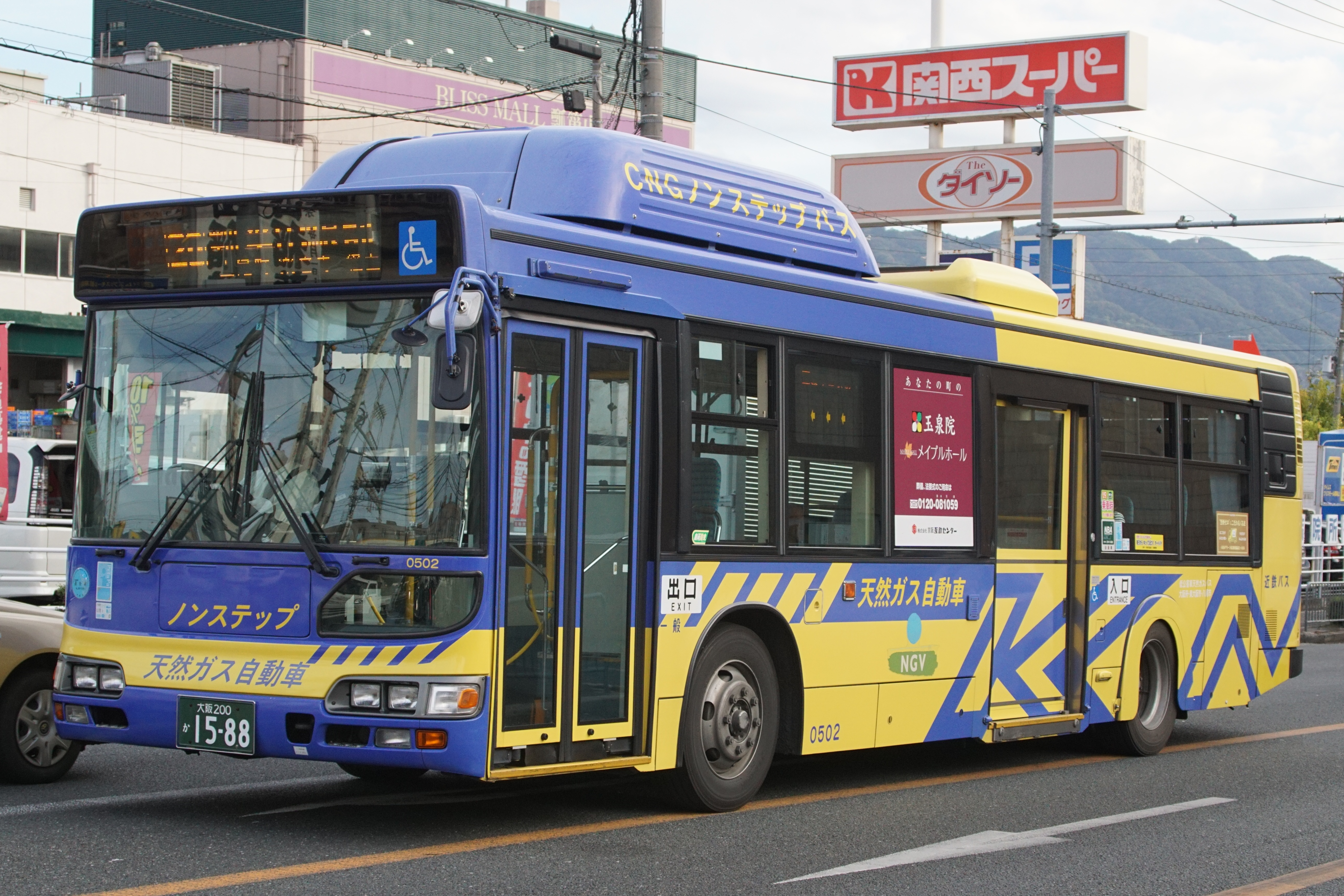
- Kintetsu route bus (Hino Blue Ribbon)
- Parent: Kintetsu Bus Holdings (part of the Kintetsu Group)
- Founded: May 6, 1999
- Headquarters: Higashiōsaka, Osaka
- Service area: Osaka Prefecture and Fushimi Ward, Kyoto Prefecture

Kintetsu Bus Co., Ltd. (近鉄バス株式会社, Kintesu Basu Kabushiki-gaisha), operating as Kintetsu Bus, is a Japanese bus company operating in Osaka Prefecture and Kyoto Prefecture. The company is part of the Kintetsu Group, which also operates Kintetsu Railway, one of Japan's major private railway operators.

== Services ==
Kintetsu Bus operates route buses [ja], community buses [ja], express buses (Highway buses) [ja], Airport Limousine buses [ja], sightseeing buses [ja] and charter buses [ja] in Osaka Prefecture and Kyoto Prefecture. Services/service areas include:

=== Route buses ===
- Eastern Osaka Prefecture
- Fushimi Ward, Kyoto Prefecture

=== Community Buses ===
- Daito City Community Bus
- Settsu City Loop Bus

=== Express buses (Highway buses) ===
- Osaka/Kyoto ↔ Sendai ("Forest")
- Osaka/Kyoto ↔ Yokohama/Tokyo/Tokyo Disneyland ("Flying Liner")
- Osaka/Kyoto ↔ Hachioji/Shinjuku ("Twinkle")
- Osaka/Kyoto ↔ Nagasaki ("Oranda")
- Osaka/Kyoto ↔ Kumamoto ("Sunrise")

=== Airport Limousine buses ===
- Ōsaka Uehommachi Bus Terminal ↔ Kansai Airport
- Universal Studios Japan ↔ Kansai Airport
- Doton Plaza Osaka ↔ Kansai Airport
- Ōsaka Uehommachi Bus Terminal ↔ Osaka Itami Airport
- Universal Studios Japan ↔ Osaka Itami Airport

=== Sightseeing buses ===
- Osaka Sky Vista – open-top double-deck sightseeing bus

== Photo Gallery ==
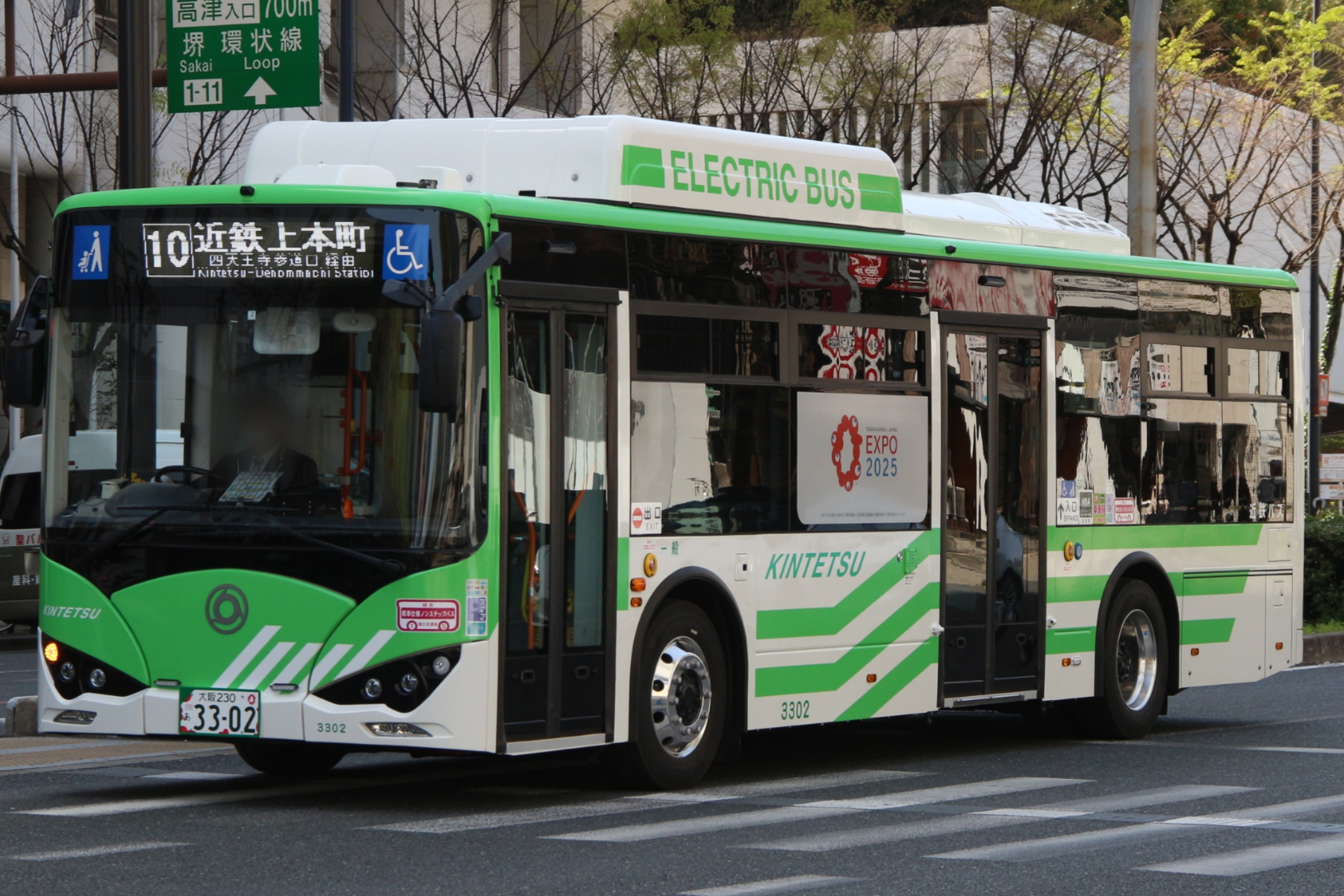
Route bus (BYD K8 Electric bus). March 2023

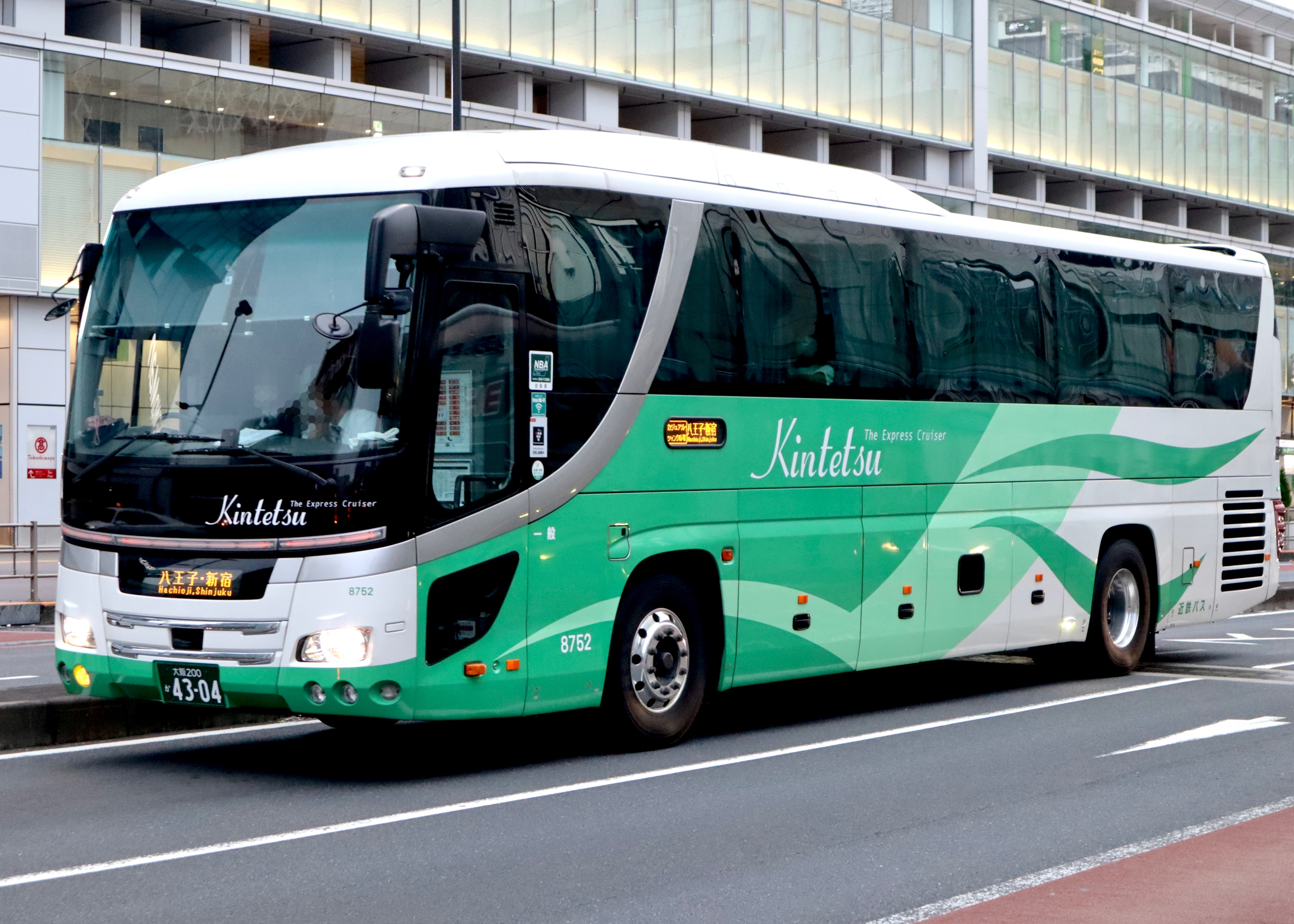
Highway bus. October 2022

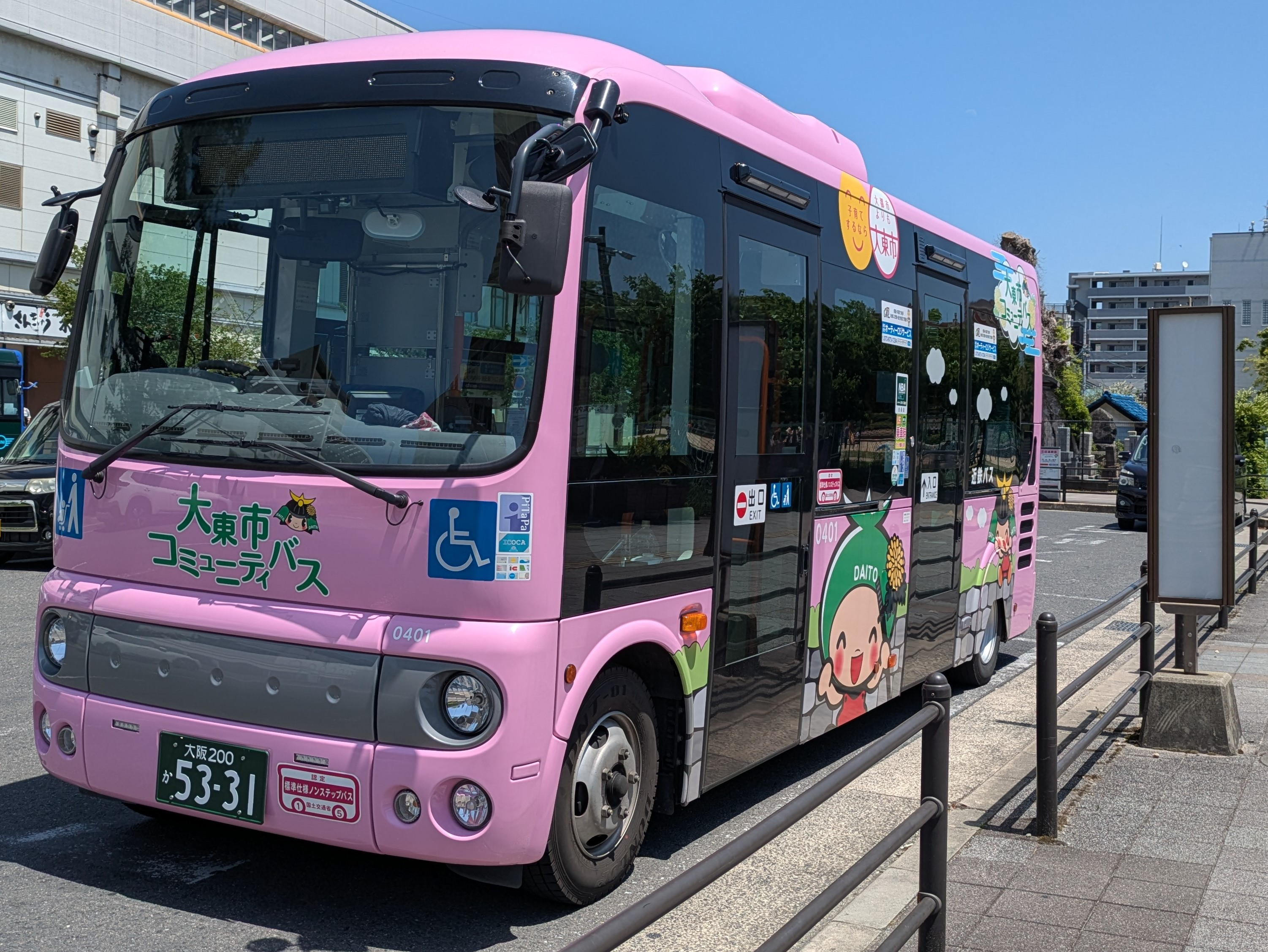
Daito City Community Bus (Hino Poncho). May 2025
