= Kintetsu Department Store =

Japanese department store chain

Kintetsu Department Store Co., Ltd. 株式会社近鉄百貨店
- Company type: Public KK
- Traded as: TYO: 8244
- ISIN: JP3250800004
- Industry: Retail
- Founded: Kyoto, Japan (September 29, 1934, "Marubutsu Company")
- Headquarters: 1-43, Abenosuji Itchome, Abeno-ku, Osaka, Japan
- Number of locations: 12 in Japan
- Area served: Kansai region
- Revenue: ▼¥291,502 million (2012); ¥295,763 million (2011)
- Operating income: ▲¥3,185 million (2012); ¥3,092 million (2011)
- Net income: ▼¥−13,266 million (2012); ¥1,796 million (2011)
- Total assets: ▼¥142,373 million (2012); ¥160,925 million (2011)
- Total equity: ▲¥24,676 million (2012); ¥12,556 million (2011)
- Parent: Kintetsu Group Holdings
- Website: abenoharukas.d-kintetsu.co.jp (in Japanese)

Kintetsu Department Store Co., Ltd. (株式会社近鉄百貨店, Kabushiki gaisha Kintetsu Hyakkaten) is a department store chain in the Kansai region, Japan. It is headquartered in Abenosuji Itchome, Abeno-ku, Osaka, Japan.

== History ==
- January, 1920: Kyoto Bussankan (京都物産館) was opened in front of Kyoto Station.
- February, 1920: Kyoto Bussankan General Partnership (合名会社京都物産館) was founded.
- 1926: Osaka Electric Railway Co., Ltd. (大阪電気軌道株式会社; the predecessor of Kintetsu Corporation) opened its own restaurant at Daiki Building in Uehommachi, Osaka.
- 1930: Kyoto Bussankan General Partnership opened branch store in Yanagase, Gifu.
- September, 1931: Kyoto Bussankan General Partnership was renamed Marubutsu General Partnership (合名会社丸物).
- September 29, 1934: Marubutsu General Partnership was reorganised as Marubutsu Company (株式会社丸物).
- 1934: Osaka Railway Co., Ltd. (大阪鉄道株式会社) founded Daitetsu Department Store Company (株式会社大鉄百貨店).
- September, 1936: Daiki Department Store (大軌百貨店) was opened in Uehommachi, Osaka.
- November, 1937: Daitetsu Department Store was opened in Abeno, Osaka.
- March, 1941: Daiki consolidated Sangu Kyuko Railway Company and was renamed Kansai Kyuko Electric Railway Co., Ltd. (関西急行鉄道株式会社), thus, Daiki Department Store was renamed Kankyu Department Store (関急百貨店).
- April 1, 1944: Kankyu consolidated Daitetsu Department Store Company, thus, Kankyu Department Store was reestablished as Kankyu Department Store Uehommachi (関急百貨店上本町店) and Daitetsu Department Store (大鉄百貨店) as Kankyu Department Store Abeno (関急百貨店阿倍野店).
- June 1, 1944: Kankyu and Nankai Railway were consolidated to form Kinki Nippon Railway Co., Ltd. (近畿日本鉄道株式会社; Kinki Nippon or Kin-Nichi, present: Kintetsu Group Holdings Co., Ltd.). Kankyu Department Stores were renamed Kinki Nippon Railway Uehommachi Department Store (近畿日本鉄道上本町百貨店) and Kinki Nippon Railway Abeno Department Store (近畿日本鉄道阿倍野百貨店).
- 1948: Kinki Nippon Railway Department Stores were renamed Kintetsu Department Store Uehommachi (近鉄百貨店上本町店) and Kintetsu Department Store Abeno (近鉄百貨店阿倍野店).
- September, 1960: Beppu Kintetsu Kaikan Compcny (別府近鉄会館) was opened in front of Beppu Station.
- July 1, 1961: Beppu Kintetsu Kaikan was renamed Beppu Kintetsu Department Store (別府近鉄百貨店).
- March 14, 1972: Kintetsu Department Store Nara was opened near Yamato-Saidaiji Station.
- April, 1972: Kintetsu Department Store Co., Ltd. (株式会社近鉄百貨店) was founded.
- June 1, 1972: The department store business in Osaka and Nara was transferred to Kintetsu Department Store from Kintetsu.
- May 11, 1974: Tokyo Kintetsu Department Store (東京近鉄百貨店) was opened in front of Kichijoji Station in Musashino, Tokyo.
- May, 1977: Marubutsu Company was renamed Kyoto Kintetsu Department Store Co., Ltd. (株式会社京都近鉄百貨店).
- October 5, 1978: Kintetsu Department Store Higashiosaka was opened in the same location as Fuse Station.
- November 15, 1982: Kintetsu Department Store Nishi-Kyoto was opened in Kyoto Family, Ukyo-ku, Kyoto.
- April 25, 1987: Kintetsu Department Store Kashihara was opened near Yamato-Yagi Station.
- March 1, 1991: Kintetsu Department Store Co., Ltd. consolidated Beppu Kintetsu Department Store Co., Ltd.
- April 12, 1991: Kintetsu Department Store Sakurai was opened.
- March 31, 1994: Kintetsu Department Store Sakurai was closed.
- August 31, 1994: Kintetsu Department Store Beppu was closed.
- February 28, 1995: Kintetsu Department Store Nishi-Kyoto was closed.
- November 26, 1996: Kintetsu Department Store Momoyama was opened near Rokujizō Station.
- March 19, 1997: Kintetsu Department Store Ikoma was opened.
- September 1, 1998: Kintetsu Department Store Co., Ltd. consolidated Hirakata Kintetsu Department Store Co., Ltd.
- September 28, 1998: Kintetsu Department Store Kikyogaoka was opened.
- September 30, 1999: Kyoto Kintetsu Department Store Gifu was closed.
- March 25, 2000: Kyoto Kintetsu Department Store Kyoto was renewed and opened as "Platz Kintetsu".
- September 1, 2000: "Hoop" was opened in the south of the department store in Abeno, Osaka.
- February 20, 2001: Kintetsu Department Store Tokyo was closed.
- February 28, 2001: Kyoto Kintetsu Department Store Co., Ltd. consolidated former Kintetsu Department Store Co., Ltd. Kyoto Kintetsu was renamed Kintetsu Department Store Co., Ltd., and relocated its head office at Osaka Abenobashi Station in Abeno-ku, Osaka.
- February 28, 2007: Kintetsu Department Store Kyoto (Platz Kintetsu) was closed.
- March, 2008: The destruction of Kintetsu Department Store Kyoto (Platz Kintetsu) was finished.
- September 9, 2008: "Abeno Natural Days (Abeno and)" was opened in the south of Hoop in Abeno-ku, Osaka.
- March 1, 2009: Kintetsu Department Store Co., Ltd. consolidated Chubu Kintetsu Department Store Co. (subsidiary of Kintetsu Department Store Co., Ltd.) and Wakayama Kintetsu Department Store Co. (in front of JR Wakayama Station, subsidiary of Kintetsu Corporation).

former Chubu Kintetsu Department Store - located in Nagoya (Aichi Prefecture), Yokkaichi (Mie Prefecture) and Kusatsu (Shiga Prefecture)
former Wakayama Kintetsu Department Store - located in Wakayama (Wakayama Prefecture)

- February 29, 2012: Kintetsu Department Store Hirakata was closed.
- June 13, 2013: Kintetsu Department Store Abeno was reopened and renamed "Kintetsu Department Store Main Store Abeno Harukas" (pre-opening).
- February 22, 2014: The renovation was finished at the Main Store Abeno Harukas Wing Building, preparing for the opening of Abeno Harukas on March 7.

== Stores ==
- Main Store Abeno Harukas - Abenobashi Terminal Building, Abenosuji Itchome, Abeno-ku, Osaka

The same location as Ōsaka Abenobashi Station on the Minami Osaka Line, and close to Tennoji Station on the three lines of West Japan Railway Company (JR West) and the two lines of Osaka Municipal Subway. Located on the lower level floors of 60-story skyscraper Abeno Harukas. It houses the largest floor area of any department store in Japan. The store was renamed from "Kintetsu Department Store Abeno" on the pre-opening day, June 13, 2013.

- Uehommachi - Uehommachi Rokuchome, Tennoji-ku, Osaka

The same location as Ōsaka Uehommachi Station on the Osaka Line

- Higashiosaka - Ajiro, Higashiosaka, the first floor of Fuse Station on the Osaka Line and the Nara Line
- Nara - NaRa Family, Saidaiji-higashimachi, Nara, close to Yamato-Saidaiji Station on the Nara Line, the Kyoto Line and the Kashihara Line
- Kashihara - Kita-Yagicho, Kashihara, close to Yamato-Yagi Station on the Osaka Line and the Kashihara Line
- Ikoma - Tanidacho, Ikoma, close to Ikoma Station on the Nara Line, the Ikoma Line and the Keihanna Line
- Kusatsu - Shibukawa, Kusatsu, close to Kusatsu Station operated by West Japan Railway Company (JR West) (Tokaido Line (Biwako Line), Kusatsu Line)
- Wakayama - Tomodacho, Wakayama, close to Wakayama Station operated by West Japan Railway Company (JR West) (Kisei Line, Hanwa Line, Wakayama Railway Kishigawa Line)
- Yokkaichi - Suwa-Sakaemachi, Yokkaichi, the same location as Kintetsu Yokkaichi Station on the Nagoya Line
- Nagoya (Kintetsu Pass'e) - Meieki, Nakamura-ku, Nagoya, the same location as Kintetsu Nagoya Station on the Kintetsu Nagoya Line (Expected to close on February 28, 2026)

=== Related stores ===
- Hoop - Abenosuji, Abeno-ku, Osaka, the south of Ōsaka Abenobashi Station
- and (Abeno Natural Days) - Abenosuji, Abeno-ku, Osaka, the south of "Hoop"
- Star Island - Suwa-Sakaemachi, Yokkaichi, close to Kintetsu Yokkaichi Station
- Uehommachi Yufura - Uehommachi Rokuchome, Tennoji-ku, Osaka, the south of Kintetsu Department Store Uehommachi and Osaka Uehommachi Station.

=== Former stores ===
- Tokyo (1974-2001) - Kichijoji-honcho, Musashino, at the present Yodobashi Kichijoji. close to Kichijoji Station on the East Japan Railway Company (JR East) Chuo Line, the Keio Corporation Inokashira Line
- Nishi-Kyoto (1982-1995) - Ukyo-ku, Kyoto, inside Kyoto Family
- Sakurai (1991-1994)
- Beppu (1960-1994) - close to Beppu Station on the Kyushu Railway Company (JR Kyushu) Nippo Main Line
- Momoyama (MOMO) (1996-2014) - Momoyamacho Yamanoshita, Fushimi-ku, Kyoto, close to Rokujizō Station on the West Japan Railway Company (JR West) Nara Line and the Kyoto Municipal Subway Tōzai Line
- Shop Kikyogaoka (1998-2018) - Kintetsu Plaza Kikyogaoka, Kikyogaoka Ichibancho, Nabari, close to Kikyogaoka Station on the Kintetsu Osaka Line

==== Former Marubutsu ====
- Kyoto (former Marubutsu, former Kyoto Kintetsu Department Store) (1920-2007) - Shimogyo-ku, Kyoto, at the present Kyoto Yodobashi
- Kyoto Kintetsu Department Store Gifu (former Marubutsu Gifu) - Yanagase, Gifu, at the present Gifu Chunichi Building
- Hirakata (former Hirakata Marubutsu) (1975-2012) - Oka-higashicho, Hirakata, close to Hirakatashi Station on the Keihan Electric Railway Keihan Main Line, at the present Hirakata T-SITE
- Tokyo Marubutsu stores (present PARCO)
  - Ikebukuro (1958-1969) - close to Ikebukuro Station, at the present PARCO Ikebukuro
  - Shinjuku (-1965) - along Yasukuni-dori, at the present Isetan Shinjuku Men's Building
  - Shibuya (-1969) - Udagawasho, Shibuya, at the present Shibuya PARCO
- Toyohashi Marubutsu (-1973) - close to Toyohashi Station on Central Japan Railway Company (JR Central)
- Yahata Marubutsu (-1969) - Yahatahigashi-ku, Kitakyushu

== See also ==
- Kintetsu Group Holdings
