= Kintetsu World Express =

Japanese freight forwarding company

Kintetsu World Express, Inc. (KWE) 株式会社近鉄エクスプレス
- Company type: Public KK
- Traded as: TYO: 9375
- Industry: Logistics
- Founded: January 10, 1970
- Headquarters: Shinagawa Intercity Tower A, Kōnan, Minato, Tokyo, Japan
- Key people: Nobutoshi Torii (President and CEO)
- Products: Domestic and foreign freight forwarding business
- Revenue: ▲¥474,330 million (FY ended March 2017)
- Operating income: ▲¥13,075 million (FY ended March 2017)
- Net income: ▲¥4,487 million (FY ended March 2017)
- Number of employees: 18,129 (consolidated)
- Website: www.kwe.com (Global Site)

Kintetsu World Express, Inc. (株式会社近鉄エクスプレス, Kabushiki-gaisha Kintetsu express), or KWE, is a major Japanese freight forwarding company. It is a subsidiary of the Japanese railway holding company Kintetsu Group Holdings (近鉄グループホールディングス株式会社 Kintetsu gurūpu hōrudeingusu kabushiki gaisha) and provides air and sea freight forwarding, customs brokerage, and warehouse inventory management services.

== History ==
In 1948, the Operations Bureau of Kintetsu Corporation began handling international freight and travel services. Shortly after, the International Air Transport Association (IATA) approves Kintetsu Corporation as an agency.

In 1955, Kintetsu Corporation developed into Kinki Nippon Tourist Co., Ltd. (KNT), and combines its international air freight and international tourism divisions to create a luggage handling service. The Hong Kong and United States subsidiaries were established in 1969, and Kintetsu World Express, Inc. spun off from KNT in 1970. KWE experienced rapid expansion for the next 30 years, and adopted the Quadrilateral Management System with regional headquarters for Japan; The Americas; Europe & Africa; and Asia & Oceania.

The company was first listed on the NASDAQ Japan Market (now JASDAQ Market), and a section of Osaka Securities Exchange until 2004, when it was de-listed. In 2003, KWE’s stock listing was upgraded to the First Section of the Tokyo Stock Exchange.

KWE revised its management system in 2006 to a Five Regional Management System to better support its 40 affiliated companies and 10 representative offices in 32 countries outside Japan: management was established for Japan; The Americas; Europe, Middle East & Africa; Southeast Asia; and Asia & Oceania.

In 2008, KWE acquired Thailand-based TKK Logistics Co. Ltd., formerly known as Thai Kargo Kare Co., Ltd.

In 2012, Kintetsu World Express, Inc. signed a joint venture agreement with India-based provider Gati to form Gati-Kintetsu Express Pvt. Ltd. The joint venture would provide express distribution and supply chain solutions across the Asia Pacific region and SAARC countries.

In 2015, Kintetsu World Express, Inc. acquired APL Logistics from Neptune Orient Lines (NOL) for US $1.2 billion.

== Board of chairmen ==
- Kazuyasu Ueda, chairman of the board
- Nobutoshi Torii, representative director and president
- Joji Tomiyama, director and executive vice president
- Keisuke Hirata, director and managing executive officer
- Katsufumi Takahashi, director and managing officer
- Kiyoyuki Hirosawa, director and managing officer
- Tetsuya Kobayashi, outside director
- Yukio Ueno, outside director
- Sanae Tanaka, outside director
