= Allcargo Logistics =

Indian logistics company private limited

Allcargo Logistics Limited

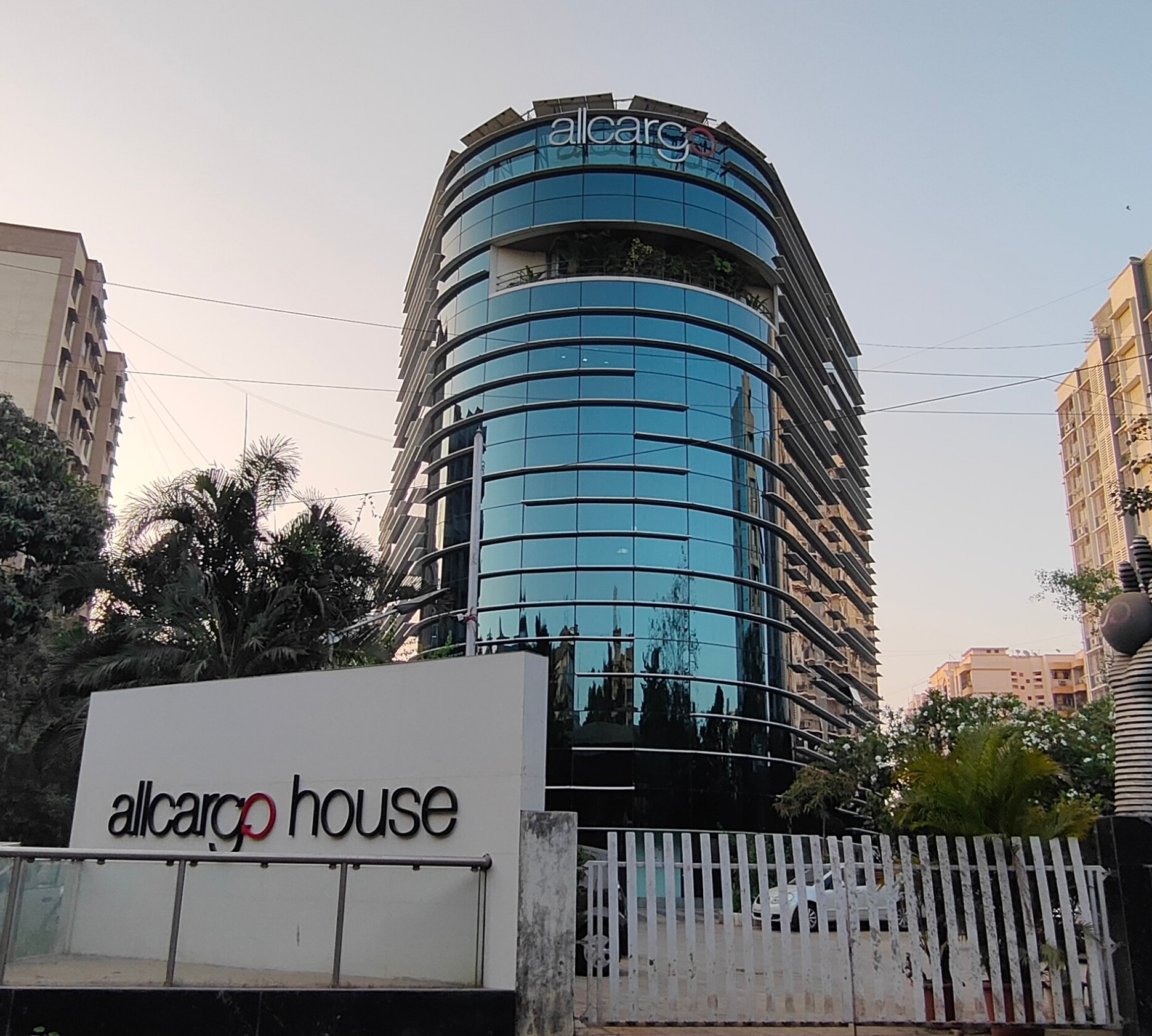
- Allcargo Logistics' head office in Mumbai, India
- Type: Public
- Traded as: BSE: 532749; NSE: ALLCARGO
- ISIN: INE418H01029
- Industry: Logistics; Transportation
- Founded: August 18, 1993; 33 years ago
- Founder: Shashi Kiran Shetty
- Headquarters: Mumbai, Maharashtra, India
- Area served: Worldwide
- Services: Multimodal transport
- Revenue: ▲₹20,072 crore (US$2.1 billion)
- Number of employees: 557 (2025)
- Subsidiaries: ECU Worldwide; Gati; Nordicon
- Website: www.allcargologistics.com

Allcargo Logistics Limited is an Indian logistics company, based in Mumbai. It offers courier, package delivery, and express mail services worldwide.

== History ==
The company, founded by Shashi Kiran Shetty, commenced operations in 1994 as a cargo handling operator at Jawaharlal Nehru Port, Mumbai. Initially, the company started as a customs house agent and provided freight forwarding services.

In 1995, ECU-Line, an Antwerp-based logistics firm, appointed Allcargo as their India agent. In 2003, the company started its first Container Freight Station (CFS) at JNPT. In 2007, it started two new CFSs at Chennai (in Tamil Nadu) and Mundra (in Gujarat), and one in Kolkata (in West Bengal), in 2017.

In 2018, Allcargo Logistics decided to monetize its existing land banks and expand into logistics and industrial parks to provide warehousing services under the name Allcargo Logistics Industrial Parks Private Limited.

As of 2020, Allcargo is one of the largest non-vessel operating common carrier, with a focus on Less-than-container load business and domestic interests in container freight stations, international supply chain, express distribution, and contract logistics.

In June 2023 Allcargo re-designates Shashi Kiran Shetty as Executive Chairman.

=== Mergers and acquisitions ===
In 2006, Allcargo acquired Antwerp-based ECU-Line, an ocean freight services provider, whose agent it was in India. In the same year, private equity firm New Vernon Capital Fund acquired 6.42% stake in Allcargo. In 2008, Blackstone GPV Capital Partners picked up a 6% stake in the company, which was later increased to 14.99% in by converting warrants worth US$23 million.

In 2013, Allcargo Logistics acquired US-based Econocaribe Consolidators and a controlling stake in Netherlands-based logistics company FCL Marine Rotterdam through its wholly owned arm Ecuhold NV.

In 2016, ECU-Line, Econocaribe and other international acquisitions were rebranded into ECU Worldwide.

In 2020, it acquired controlling stake in Hyderabad-based Gati Ltd.

In July 2021, Allcargo acquired 65% stake in Swedish logistics major Nordicon for $29 million.

== Services ==
=== Multimodal Transport Operations (MTO) ===
Allcargo's MTO service comprises NVOCC operations related to LCL consolidation and neutral FCL activities globally, through its wholly owned subsidiary ECU Worldwide. Initially, Allcargo entered the business of LCL consolidation as agents of ECU Worldwide (then known as ECU-Line). With an international network across 180 countries, the division provides direct export/import and multicity consolidation services.

=== Container Freight Stations (CFS) and Inland Container Depots (ICD) ===
Allcargo commenced CFS operations in 2003 at JNPT (Navi Mumbai). At present, it operates four CFSs (one at JNPT and one each in Chennai, Mundra and Kolkata). Its ICD at Dadri in the National Capital Region, is a joint venture with the Container Corporation of India (CONCOR), with Allcargo's stake at 51%. Its services comprise export and import handling, LCL shipments, bonded and open warehousing, first and last-mile transportation, maintenance and repair of the dry container, reefer monitoring, and hazardous material handling.

=== Third-party logistics (3PL) ===
Allcargo’s contract logistics division operates warehouses at locations like Goa, Hosur, and Bhiwandi (near Mumbai).

=== Logistics Parks ===
Allcargo’s logistics parks and warehousing facilities are located at Hyderabad, Bengaluru, Ahmedabad, Delhi (NCR) and other trade hubs.

== Gallery ==
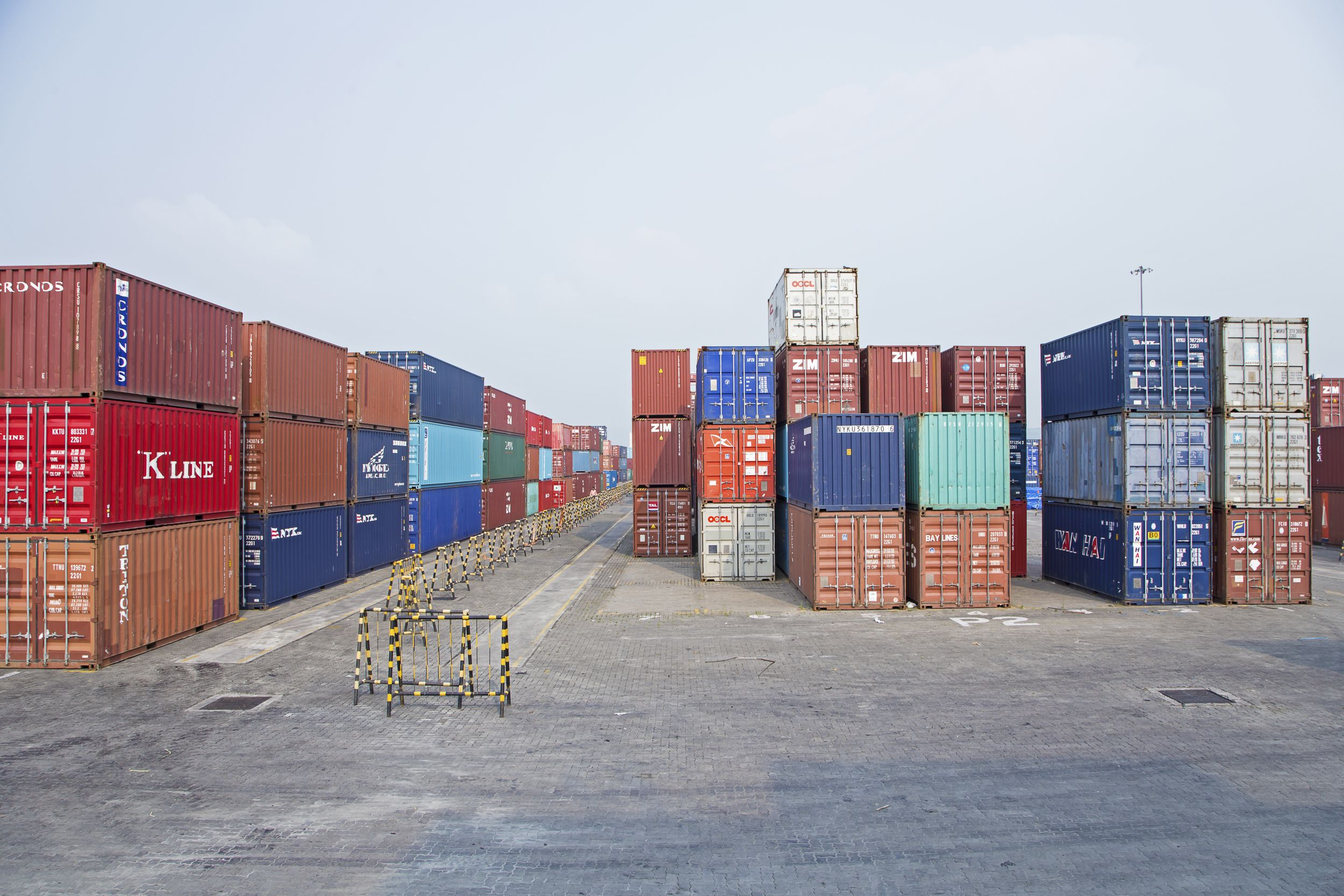
Container Freight Station, Chennai

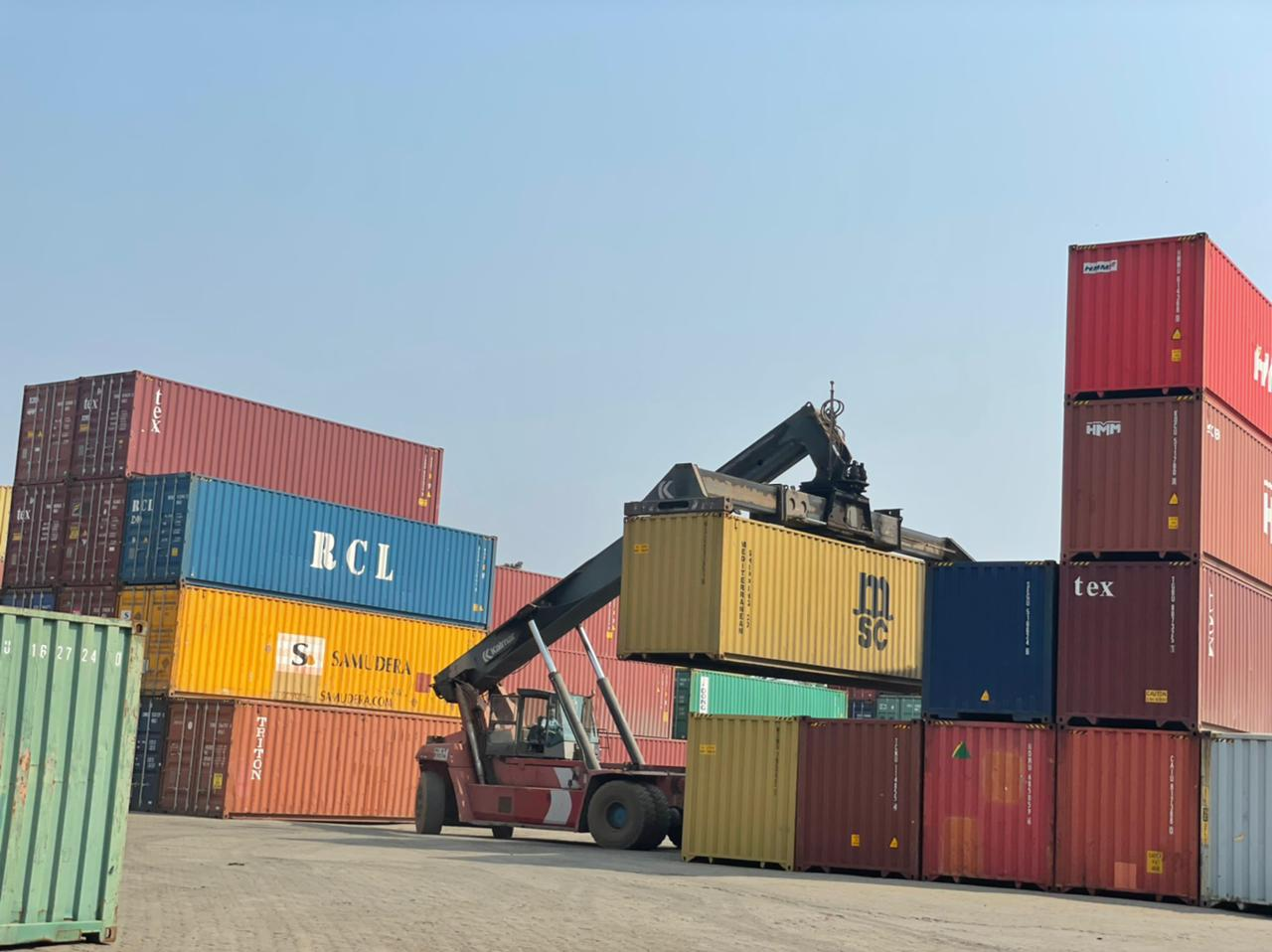
Container Freight Station, Kolkata

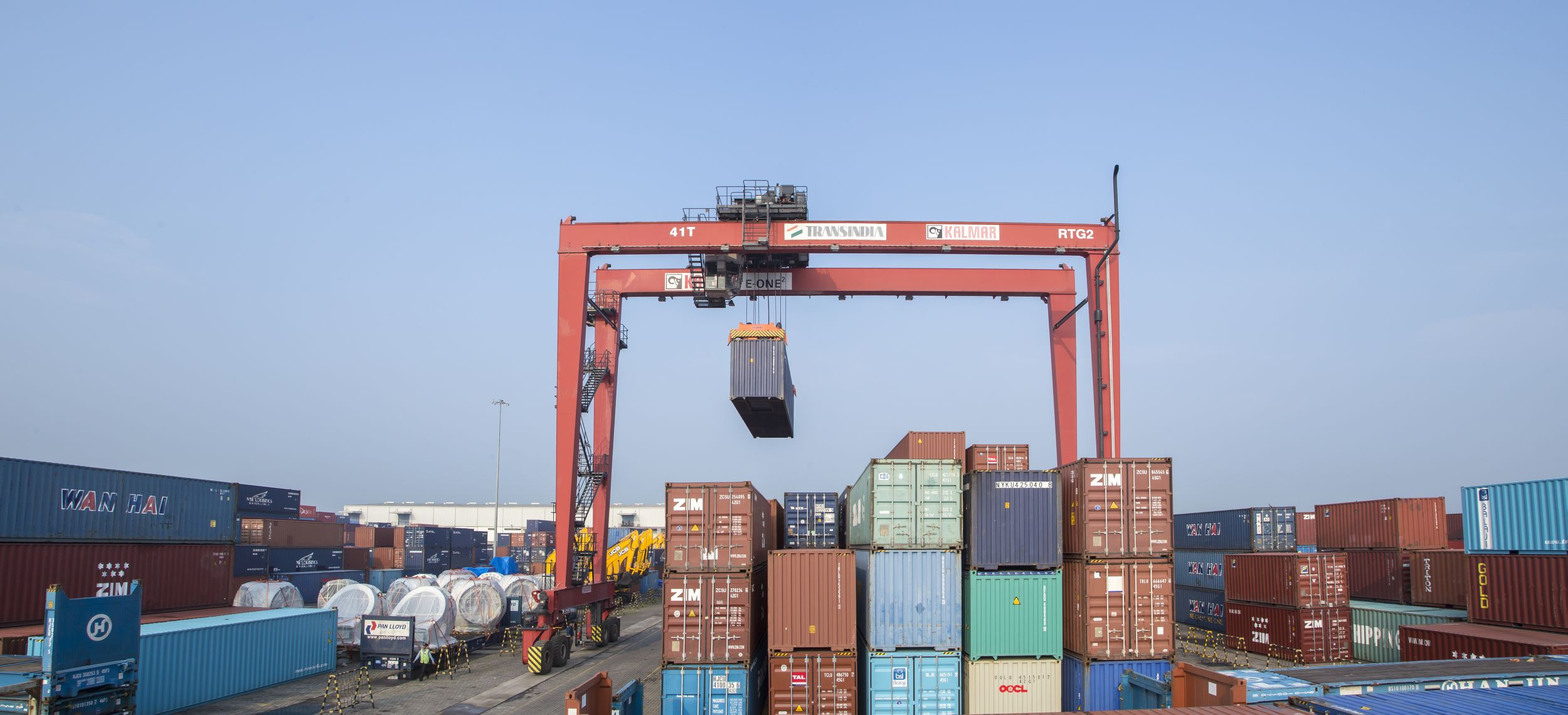
Container Freight Station, JNPT Mumbai

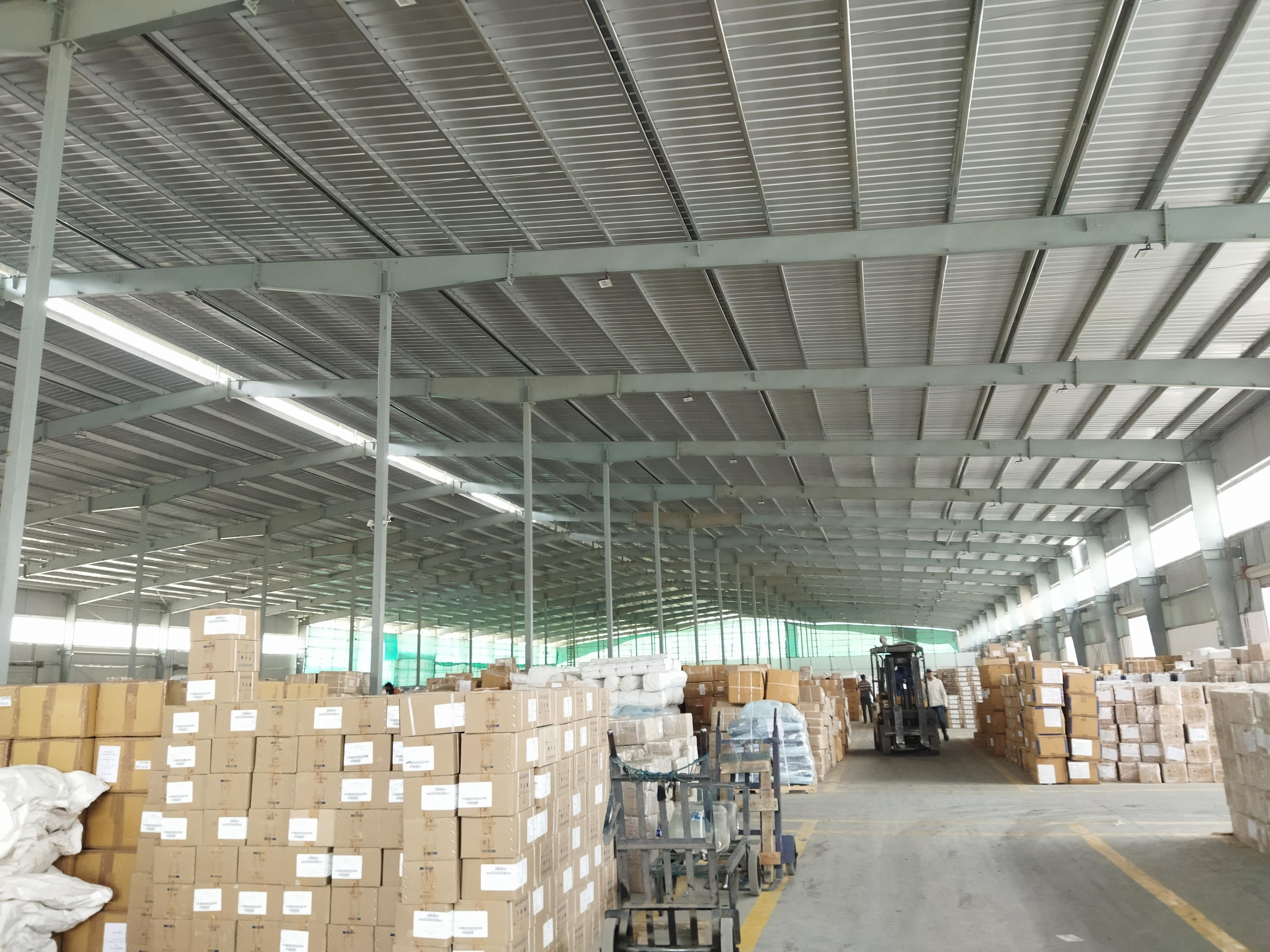
Contract Logistics Division, Mumbai
