= Kintetsu Group Holdings =

Japanese holding company

Kintetsu Group Holdings Co., Ltd.
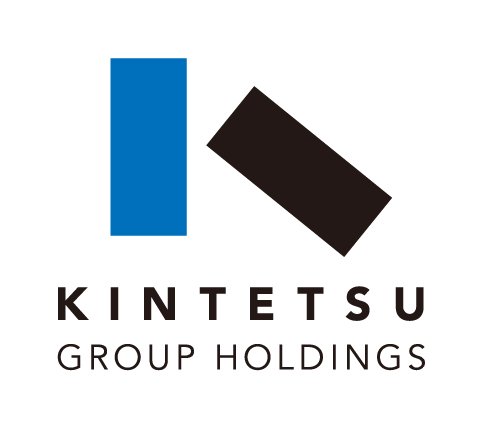
- logo
- Native name: 近鉄グループホールディングス株式会社
- Romanized name: Kintetsu gurūpu hōrudeingusu kabushiki gaisha
- Formerly: Kintetsu Corporation
- Type: Public KK
- Traded as: TYO: 9041
- Industry: Ground Transport
- Genre: Passenger Transportation
- Predecessor: Kansai Express Railway Co., Ltd.; Nankai Railway Co., Ltd.
- Founded: September 16, 1910; 116 years ago in Osaka, Osaka Prefecture, Japan
- Founder: Mataichirō Kanamori (for the Osaka Electric Tramway Co. branch); Kiyochika Iwashita (for the Osaka Electric Tramway Co. branch); Isamu Saeki (former CEO of Kintetsu Railway)
- Headquarters: 6-1-55, Uehonmachi, Tennoji-ku, Osaka, Japan
- Number of locations: 4 offices
- Area served: Japan; Philippines; Taiwan
- Key people: Joji Agena (Founder); Tetsuya Kobayashi (Chairman); Takashi Tsuji(businessman) (President)
- Brands: Kintetsu
- Services: Administration of Kintetsu Group
- Revenue: ▼¥1,217,995 million (FY2015); ▼¥1,233,798 million (FY2014) (Note: 平成27年3月期決算短信（連結） [Brief note of the Financial Results for the Fiscal Year ended March 31, 2015] (PDF) (in Japanese). Kintetsu Group Holdings. May 14, 2015.); ▲¥1,246,360 million (FY2013); ▼¥932,156 million (FY2012); ▼¥942,790 million (FY2011)
- Operating income: ▲¥64,736 million (FY2015); ▲¥56,425 million (FY2014); ▲¥54,623 million (FY2013); ▲¥47,452 million (FY2012); ▲¥40,209 million (FY2011)
- Net income: ▲¥28,956 million (FY2015); ▲¥27,864 million (FY2014); ▲¥24,598 million (FY2013); ▲¥20,001 million (FY2012); ▼¥8,666 million (FY2011)
- Total assets: ▼¥1,930,906 million (FY2015); ▼¥1,946,725 million (FY2014); ▲¥1,959,128 million (FY2013); ▲¥1,925,815 million (FY2012); ▼¥1,839,572 million (FY2011)
- Total equity: ▲¥349,668 million (FY2015); ▲¥335,452 million (FY2014); ▲¥304,555 million (FY2013); ▲¥216,486 million (FY2012); ▲¥192,338 million (FY2011)
- Number of employees: 29,048 (FY2015)
- Subsidiaries: Kintetsu Railway Co., Ltd.; Kintetsu Bus holdings Co., Ltd.; The Kinki Sharyo Co., Ltd. (14.2%+30.4%); Kintetsu Department Store Co., Ltd.; Kintetsu Real Estate Co., Ltd.; Kintetsu Leisure Service, Inc.; Nara Ikoma Rapid Transit Railway Company, Limited; Iga Railway Co., Ltd.; Yoro Railway Co., Ltd.; Kintetsu Hotel Systems Co., Ltd.; KNT-CT Holdings Co., Ltd.; Kintetsu World Express, Inc.; Mie Kotsu Group Holdings Co., Ltd.

Kintetsu Group Holdings Co., Ltd. (近鉄グループホールディングス株式会社, Kintetsu gurūpu hōrudeingusu kabushiki gaisha), referred to as Kintetsu GHD (近鉄GHD), is a Japanese railway holding company which primarily owns the Kintetsu Railway as well as Kintetsu World Express, Kintetsu Department Store, and its other 141 corporations, which are collectively known as Kintetsu Group.

Its subsidiaries operates tourism, real estate, and shipping companies, and has a major rail car-building operation Kinki Sharyo which produces trains used in Japan, the United States, Egypt and Hong Kong.

== History ==
Kinki Nippon Railways Co., Ltd. (近畿日本鉄道株式会社, Kinki nippon tetsudo kabushiki gaisha), a passenger rail transit company in Kinki and Tokai regions, was founded after Kansai Express Railways merged with Nankai Railways on June 1, 1944. Kinki Nippon Railways changed its legal name in English to Kintetsu Corporation on June 28, 2003. On April 1, 2015, the corporation, was restructured into a holding company, splitting its railway, real estate, logistics and retail, and recreation service divisions. Kintetsu Corporation also changed the legal name to Kintetsu Group Holdings Co., Ltd. on the same day.

== Portfolio—subsidiaries ==
=== Passenger Transportation ===
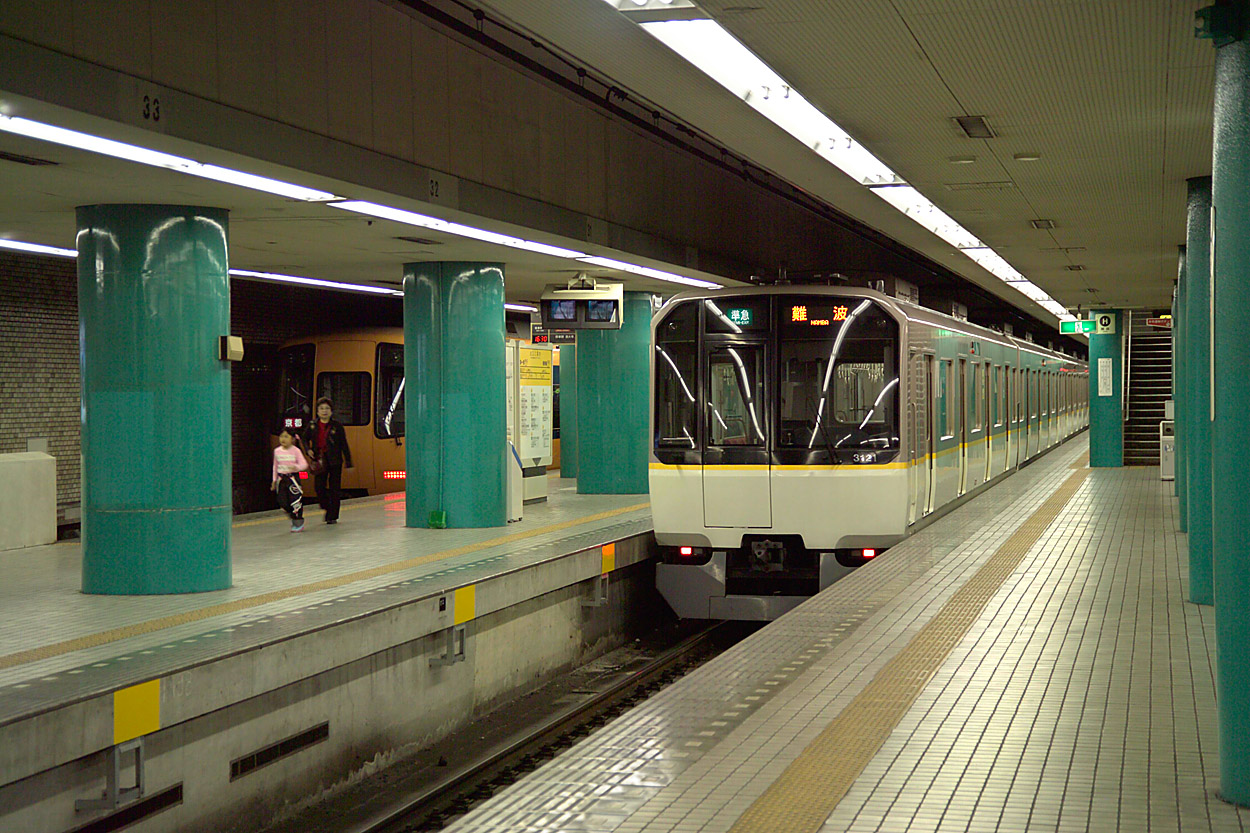
Kintetsu Nara Station, where trains for Namba and Kyoto await departure

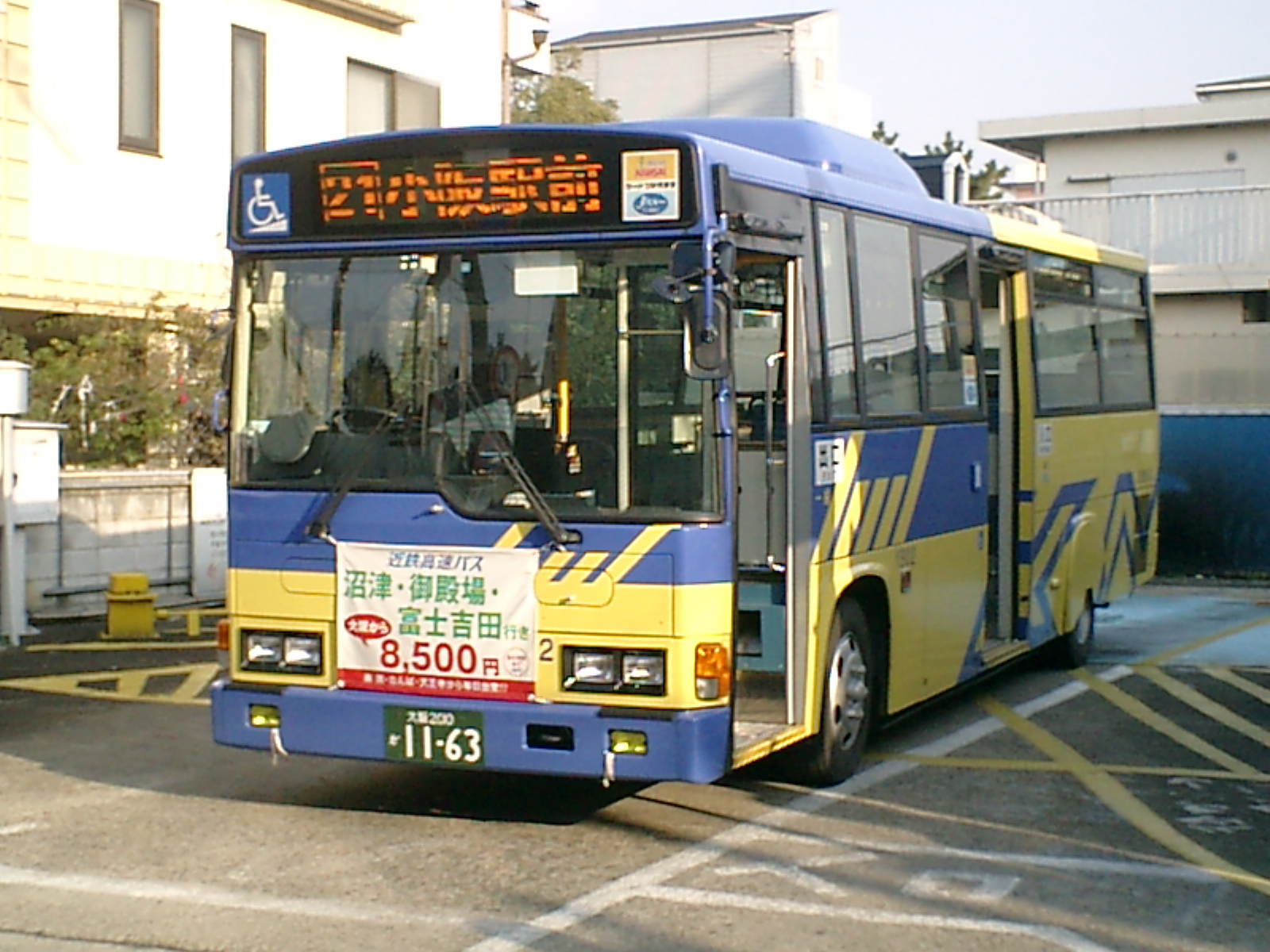
Kintetsu Bus (a subsidiary of Kintetsu Bus holdings Co., Ltd.)

- Kintetsu Beppu Ropeway
- Keihanna Bus Holdings Co., Ltd.
  - Kintetsu Bus Co., Ltd.
  - Narakanko Co., Ltd.
  - Nara Kotsu Bus Line Co., Ltd.
- Kinki Sharyo

=== Transportation and Logistics ===
- Kintetsu World Express (Air Freight)
- Fukuyama Transporting

=== Retail ===
- Kintetsu Department Store

=== Recreation Facilities and Services ===
- Kintetsu Hanazono Rugby Stadium
- Kintetsu Liners (rugby team)
- Miyako Hotels & Resorts
- Shima Spain Village theme park
- Kinki Nippon Rent-A-Car
- Kinki Nippon Tourist Travel Agency
- Osaka Kintetsu Buffaloes (baseball team, present: Orix Buffaloes)
