= Manoj Kumar Tiwari (academic) =

Manoj Kumar Tiwari FNAE, FASc, FNASc, FIISE
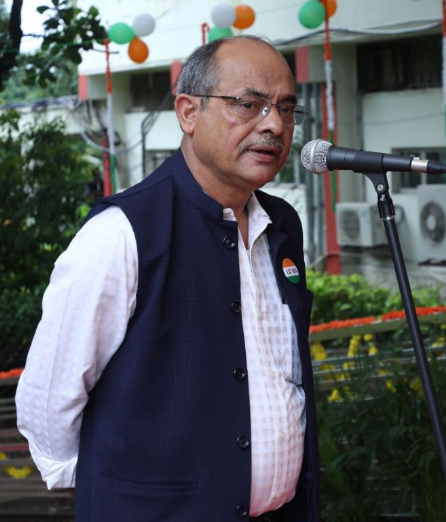
- Prof. Manoj Kumar Tiwari, addressing the audience on Independence Day, 15 August 2025.

Director of Indian Institute of Management Mumbai
- Incumbent
- Assumed office 11 August 2023
- Preceded by: Founding Director

Director of National Institute of Industrial Engineering (NITIE) Mumbai
- In office 5 November 2019 – 11 August 2023
- Succeeded by: Position upgraded to IIM Mumbai

Acting Vice-Chancellor, Tata Institute of Social Sciences
- In office 27 September 2023 – 31 July 2025

Professor, IIT Kharagpur
- In office 2007–2019

Personal details
- Born: September 10, 1962 (age 64) India
- Education: Jadavpur University (Ph.D., 2004); MNNIT Allahabad (M.Tech., 1990); VNIT Nagpur (B.E., 1986)
- Profession: Professor; Author; Consultant
- Known for: Director of IIM Mumbai; Supply Chain & Industrial Engineering
- Awards: Fellow of INAE (2013); Fellow of FASc (2024); Fellow of FNASc (2019); Fellow of IISE (2018); David F. Baker Distinguished Research Award (2023); Lillian Gilbreth Award (2021); Mahalanobis Distinguished Educator Award (2017)

Manoj Kumar Tiwari (born 10 September 1962) is an Indian scholar and researcher in manufacturing systems and supply chain management. He is the founding and incumbent director of the Indian Institute of Management Mumbai (IIM Mumbai).

== Education ==
He earned his Bachelor of Engineering in Mechanical Engineering from Visvesvaraya Regional Engineering College (now VNIT Nagpur) in 1986, followed by a Master of Technology in Production Engineering from Motilal Nehru Regional Engineering College (now MNNIT Allahabad) in 1990. He later completed his Ph.D. from Jadavpur University in 2004.

== Career ==
He began his academic career in 1990 as a Lecturer at the North Eastern Regional Institute of Science and Technology (NERIST), Itanagar. In 1998, he joined the National Institute of Advanced Manufacturing Technology (then NIFFT), Ranchi. In 2007, he joined the Department of Industrial and Systems Engineering at the Indian Institute of Technology Kharagpur. He was appointed Director of the National Institute of Industrial Engineering (NITIE), Mumbai, in 2019. In 2023, NITIE was upgraded to the Indian Institute of Management Mumbai under the Indian Institutes of Management (Amendment) Act. He was also appointed Acting Vice-Chancellor of the Tata Institute of Social Sciences (TISS), Mumbai, in September 2023.

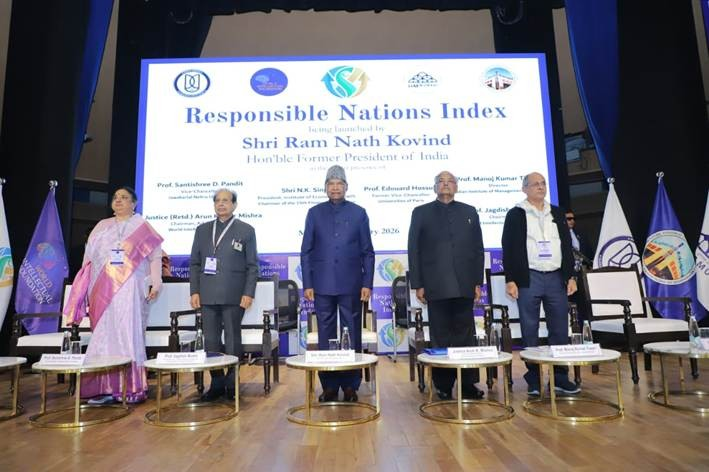
The official launch of the Responsible Nations Index (RNI), held on January 19, 2026, at the Dr. Ambedkar International Centre in New Delhi.

On 19 January 2026, Tiwari participated in the inauguration of the Responsible Nations Index (RNI) at the Dr Ambedkar International Centre, New Delhi. The event was organised under the aegis of the World Intellectual Foundation and was attended by former President Ram Nath Kovind as chief guest. IIM Mumbai served as a key knowledge partner in the development of the index, which evaluates countries on ethical governance, social well-being, environmental stewardship, and global responsibility. During the launch, Tiwari highlighted the need to assess national progress beyond economic indicators, emphasising the importance of social responsibility alongside economic performance. The inaugural session also featured addresses by Santishree D. Pandit, Vice-Chancellor of Jawaharlal Nehru University; Edouard Husson, former Vice-Chancellor of the University of Paris; and Justice (Retd.) Arun Kumar Mishra. An expert panel discussion was chaired by N. K. Singh, Chairman of the 15th Finance Commission of India.

== Awards and honours ==
In 2023, he received the David F. Baker Distinguished Research Award from the Institute of Industrial and Systems Engineers (IISE), becoming the first scholar outside the United States to be honoured with this distinction. He has been elected Fellow of the Indian National Academy of Engineering (INAE), National Academy of Sciences, India (NASI), Indian Academy of Sciences (IASc), and IISE (USA).

== Publications ==
Tiwari has contributed as Chief Editor to the book Towards Naya Bharat and served as Convenor for the report Future Talent Requirements in Logistics – A Vision 2047 under the Ministry of Education. He is also the author of Modeling of Responsive Supply Chain (2019).

== See also ==
- Official profile at IIM Mumbai
- Google Scholar
- ORCID
