= Shashi Kiran Shetty =

Indian businessman

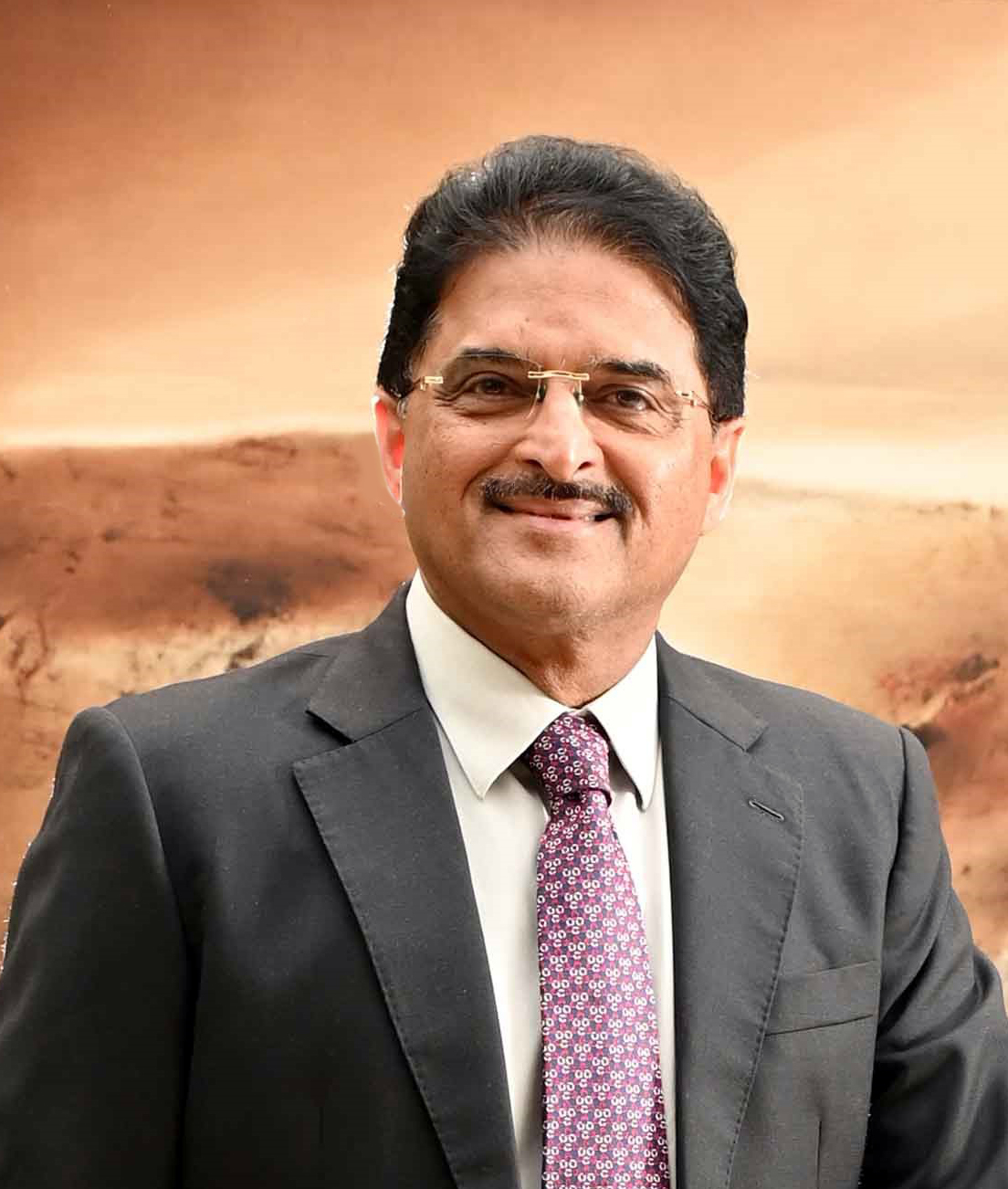
- Born: 7 June 1957 (age 69); Bantwal, Mangalore, India
- Education: Sri Venkataramana Swamy College, Bantwal
- Occupation: Businessman
- Years active: 1978–present
- Title: Chairman Allcargo Group (Allcargo Global; Allcargo Logistics; Allcargo Terminals; Transindia Real Estate)
- Spouse: Arathi Shetty
- Children: Vaishnav and Shloka
- Awards: Commander, Order of Leopold II (2015)

Shashi Kiran Shetty (born 7 June 1957) is an Indian businessman and entrepreneur, the founder of Allcargo Group, a logistics conglomerate headquartered in Mumbai. He established Allcargo Logistics in 1994 and developed it into a multinational logistics enterprise providing freight forwarding, contract logistics, and supply-chain services across global markets.

Under Shetty's leadership, the group expanded through acquisitions including Belgium-based logistics firm ECU-Line (later renamed ECU Worldwide) and Indian express logistics company Gati Ltd. He also serves as Chairperson of the Board of Governors of the Indian Institute of Management Mumbai.

== Career ==
=== Early Career ===
Shashi Kiran Shetty was born on 7 June 1957 in Bantwal, a town in Dakshina Kannada district of Karnataka, India. He studied commerce at Shri Venkatramana Swamy college in Bantwal before moving to Mumbai in 1978 in search of employment opportunities in the shipping industry.

After arriving in Mumbai, Shetty began working in the shipping sector and gained experience in port operations and freight handling, which later influenced his decision to pursue entrepreneurship in logistics. Shetty began his career in Intermodal Transport and Trading Systems Pvt. Ltd. and later worked with Forbes Gokak. At the age of 25 he established his first venture, Trans India Freight Services Pvt. Ltd., a freight forwarding and logistics services company.

=== Founding of Allcargo Logistics ===
In 1994, Shetty founded Allcargo Logistics in Mumbai as a cargo handling and logistics company operating at the Jawaharlal Nehru Port near Mumbai. The company initially provided freight forwarding and customs-house agency services. Over time the company diversified into integrated logistics services including container freight stations in 2003, multimodal transportation, contract logistics in 2016, and supply-chain management logistics parks in 2018.

=== Global expansion ===
Under Shetty's leadership, Allcargo expanded through acquisitions and partnerships. One of the group's major acquisitions was Antwerp-based ECU-Line, a global non-vessel operating common carrier in 2005, which strengthened its global less-than-container-load logistics network.

The company also diversified into container freight stations in 2003, contract logistics operations in 2016, and logistics parks in 2018. In 2020, Allcargo Logistics acquired a controlling stake in Gati Ltd., an Indian express logistics provider, expanding the group's presence in express distribution and domestic supply chain services. In 2025, Gati was rebranded as Allcargo Logistics following the completion of the scheme of strategic demerger.

=== Institutional roles ===
Outside his corporate activities, Shetty has served in leadership roles within academic and industry institutions. He is the Chairperson of the Board of Governors of the Indian Institute of Management Mumbai, formerly the National Institute of Industrial Engineering.

He has also participated in initiatives associated with international business and industry bodies such as the Confederation of Indian Industry(CII) and ASSOCHAM.

== Personal life ==
Shetty is married to Arathi Shetty, who is associated with the Avashya Foundation, the corporate social responsibility arm of the Allcargo Group. He has one son Vaishnav Shetty, Deputy Managing Director of Allcargo Global and one daughter Shloka Shetty. In June 2024, Shetty donated 3% of his shareholding in Allcargo Logistics to the Avashya Foundation, the group's philanthropic arm.

== Awards ==
- Appointed as Commander of the Order of Leopold II by King Philippe of Belgium in 2015.
- Received an Honorary Doctorate from the Mangalore University in 2015.
- Lifetime Contribution to Freight Award at The Global Freight Awards 2015, Lloyd's Loading List-Informa, London.
- In 2023, he was conferred the Rajyotsava award, the second highest civilian honor of Karnataka state.
- On account of his achievements in business, Shetty was conferred the D.Sc. Honoris Causa (Honorary Doctorate) by NITTE, Mangalore in November 2023.
- In 2023, he received the BT Best CEO Award in the Transport & Logistics category.

== See also ==
- Allcargo Logistics
- Allcargo Gati Ltd
