= 2014 Ana Ivanovic tennis season =

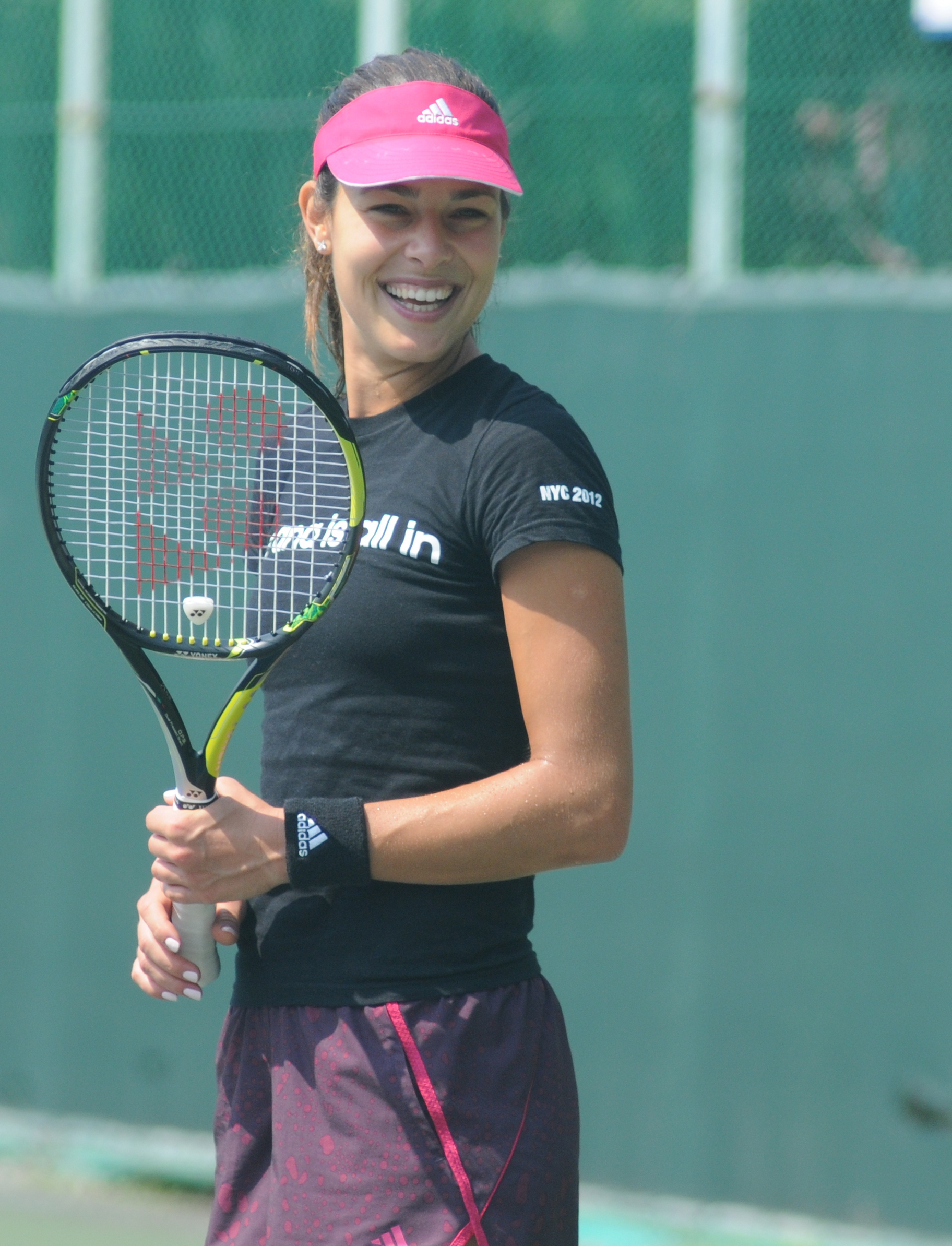
- Ana Ivanovic at the Toray Pan Pacific Open
- Full name: Ana Ivanovic
- Country: Serbia
- Calendar prize money: $2,317,649

Singles
- Season record: 59–18
- Calendar titles: 4
- Year-end ranking: No. 5
- Ranking change from previous year: ▲11

Grand Slam & significant results
- Australian Open: QF
- French Open: 3R
- Wimbledon: 3R
- US Open: 2R
- Tour Finals: RR

Doubles
- Season record: 1–2

Fed Cup
- Fed Cup: WG II Play-offs (Relegated to 2015 E/A Zone)
- Last updated on: 28 February 2016.

The 2014 Ana Ivanovic tennis season officially began with the start of the 2014 ASB Classic event in Auckland and ended with the 2014 WTA Finals. Ivanovic entered the season as the number 16th ranked player and wasn't the defending champion at any tournament.

During the season, Ivanovic reached her second Australian Open quarterfinal after reaching the final in 2008. In the fourth round she pulled off an upset by beating world No. 1 Serena Williams, who was clear favourite for the title: breaking Serena's 25 match winning streak. Despite losing in early rounds of other three Grand Slams, Ivanovic had great season, marked with the most WTA match wins of all players at 59- officially 58, as WTA doesn't count matches in Fed Cup which are in lower round than World Group II, and Ivanovic won one match against Simona Halep in World Group II Play-offs.

Ivanovic won four titles and finished the year as number five, her third top 10 season and first since 2008. It was the first time that she won 4 titles in a season, and her career record for season wins. She also had 10 wins over top 10 ranked opponents during the season, the most she had after 2007 when she had 14 wins.

== Year in detail ==
=== Australian Open series ===
==== ASB Classic ====
Ivanovic started the season playing in Auckland, ranked 16th and was seeded 2nd there. She rolled to her first final on outdoor courts since 2009 Indian Wells Masters;beating Alison Riske, Johanna Larsson, Kurumi Nara and Kirsten Flipkens, all in straight sets. Ivanovic was on course for one more straight-set win when she was leading 6–2, 5–3 against former No. 1 Venus Williams in final, but Venus then won four straight games to take the second set. Ivanovic broke soon in third set, and closed out later third set with 6–4. This was her first title on outdoor courts since winning 2008 French Open, as all of her four titles in the span came in season-ending series on indoor hardcourts, and it was her first title since 2011 overall.

==== Australian Open ====
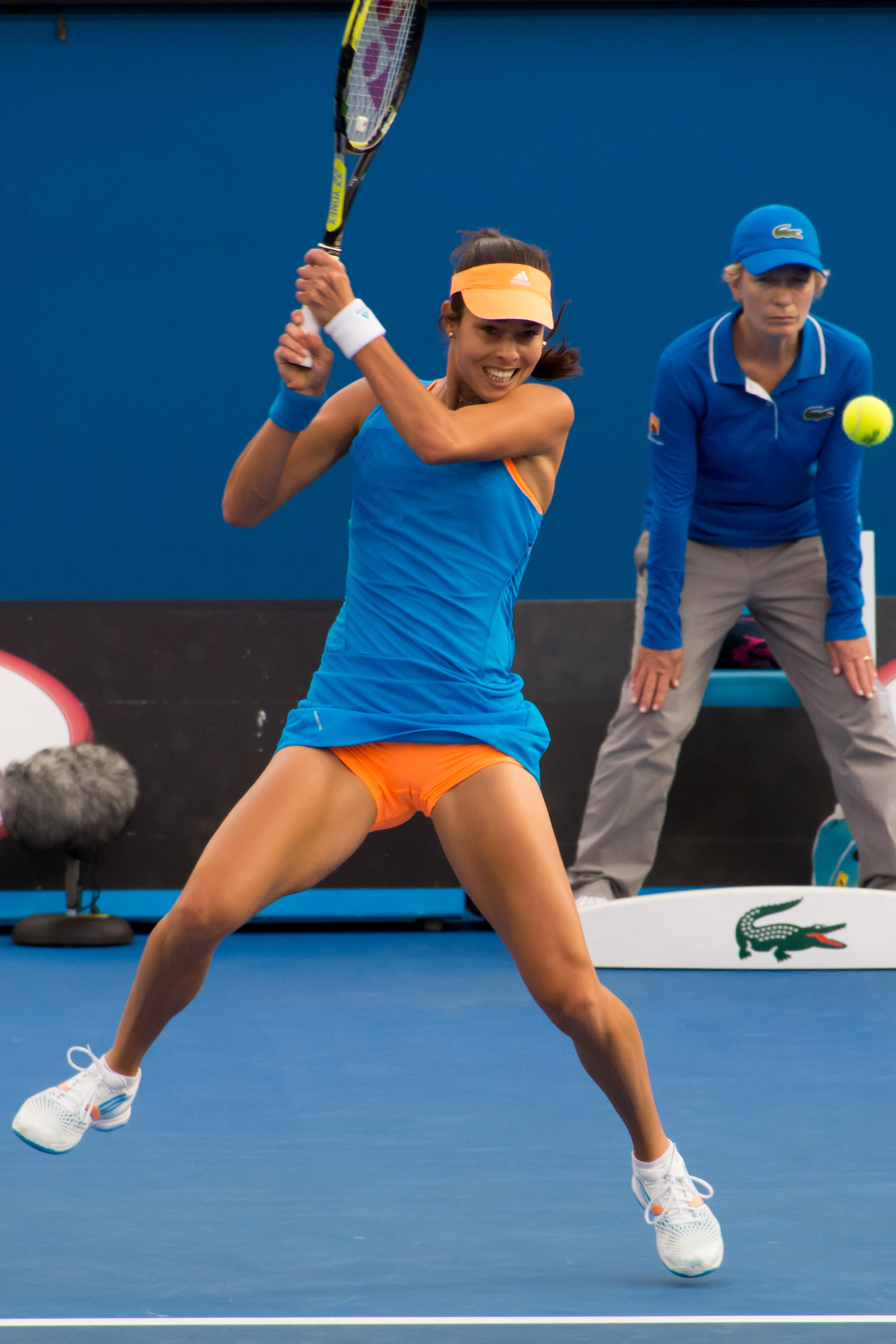
Ivanovic at Australian Open during second round match against Annika Beck.

Coming to Australian Open with her first title since 2011, Ivanovic brought good momentum from the start. She was seeded 14th and was set in line for a clash with world No. 1 Serena Williams in fourth round, though she would have to fight through a tough draw to face Williams.

Ivanovic played Dutch opponent Kiki Bertens, the future Slam finalist who was ranked 93 at the time. Ivanovic had tough battle before eventually winning, as she broke in both sets when returning at 5–4. Her next opponent was the German Annika Beck. Though Beck was ranked higher than Bertens, Ivanovic lost just three games to Beck during the match.

In the third round she played against the 17th seed Samantha Stosur, an Australian who doesn't have much success at her home soil, but was a US Open champion. Stosur led their match record at 4–3. Ivanovic started slowly, but at 3–5 and set point for Stosur, line judges called a double fault and Ivanovic had successful challenge. From there, though Ivanovic lost that set in a tiebreak, she lost just six games in next two sets and moved on.

She then had her clash with Serena, who was on a roll with 25 match winning streak dating from August 2014. Ivanovic started strong, breaking in fifth game of a match, but lost her next service game at love. Ivanovic's increased number of unforced errors after her break eventually gifted Serena first set. But, as the match continued, she became more and more confident in her service games and put more pressure on Serena's. The first set repeated itself, with Ivanovic breaking Serena's serve in the fifth game: but this time she saved it in next game, and went on to win the second set 6–3. At 1–0 for Ivanovic in third set, she broke one more time at love. Players held their service games to the end of the match, and Ivanovic eventually won 4–6, 6–3, 6–3. It was the biggest surprise of the tournament, given Serena's 4–0 record against Ivanovic before the match, and her loss record of just 4 games in 2013.

Following her win against Serena, Ivanovic lost to 30th seed Eugenie Bouchard in the quarterfinals. After Ivanovic took the first set, Bouchard broke first and stayed in the lead, eventually winning 5–7, 7–5, 6–2. Despite this loss, and a chance at winning the title as there was no more Serena and Maria Sharapova in the draw; Ivanovic had great tournament, as it was her first Aussie quarterfinal since reaching final in 2008, and just second Slam quarterfinal overall since winning title at 2008 French Open.

=== Middle East Series ===
==== Qatar Total Open ====
At the Qatar Total Open, Ivanovic followed hard loss at Australian Open with first early exit of a season, as she lost in second round to Klára Zakopalová in three sets, after Daniela Hantuchová had retired in first round when Ivanovic rebounded from nearly lost first set.

==== Dubai Tennis Championships ====
Ivanovic was ranked 12th when Dubai Tennis Championships started, but wasn't seeded because nearly all top players came. That caused a clash in the first round against #8 Angelique Kerber.

After losing the first set, she found a way to return, after both players had match points, Ivanovic won in a tiebreaker 3–6, 6–3, 7–6^{(8–6)}. In next round she lost to wildcard Venus Williams, a player whom she beat just a month ago in Auckland final. Ivanovic won just three games, the lowest number of games won in a match during her season.

=== Spring hard court season ===
==== BNP Paribas Open ====
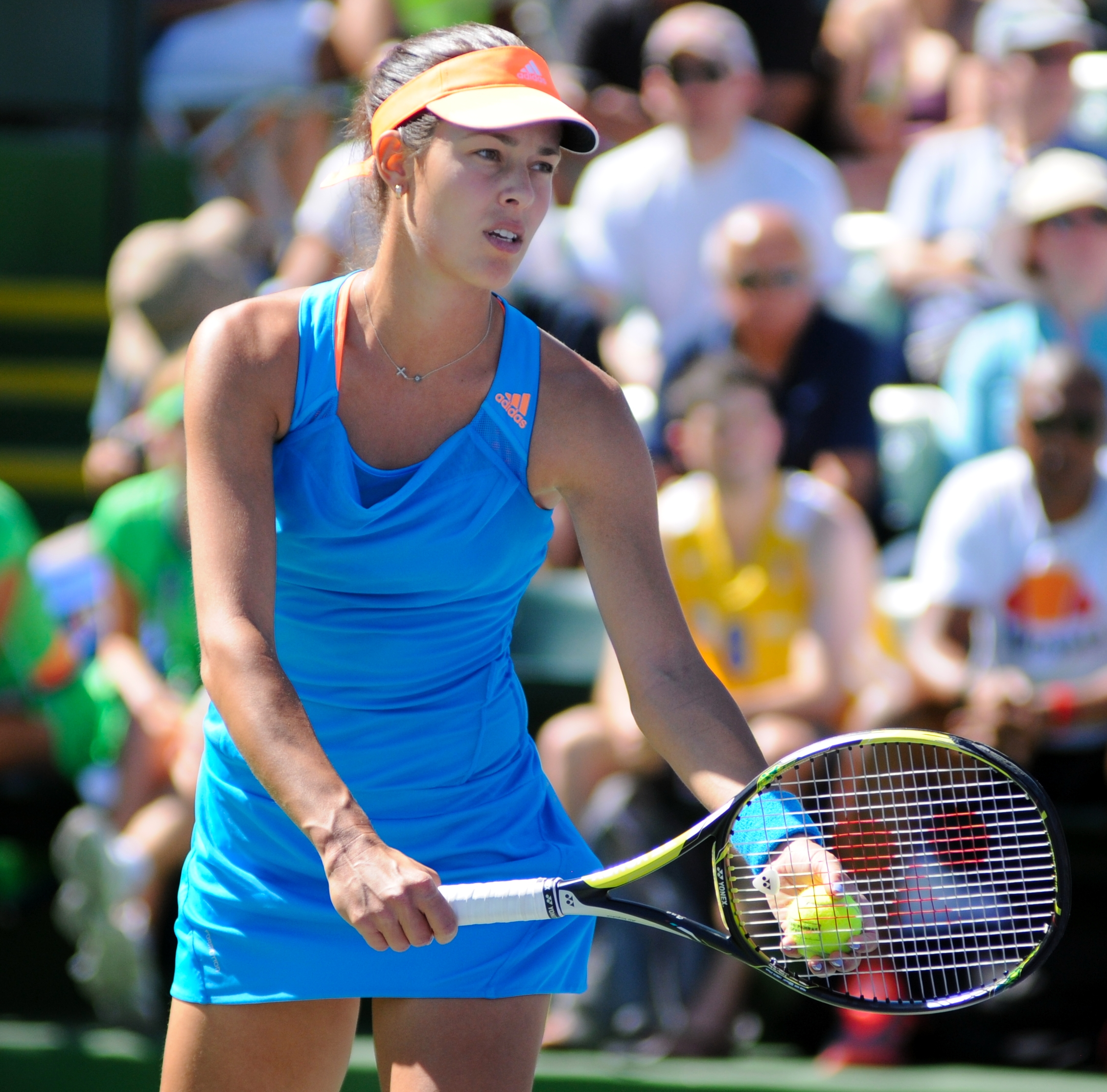
Ivanovic at the BNP Paribas Open in Indian Wells.

After receiving a bye in the first round of the BNP Paribas Open in Indian Wells as the 11th seed, she won against Elina Svitolina in three sets. After defending two match points for Svitolina in the third set, she eventually won in a tiebreak. In the third round she lost to another rising star, Sloane Stephens, in straight sets.

==== Sony Open Tennis ====
In Miami, Ivanovic brushed aside Lauren Davis in second round losing just two games, and Flavia Pennetta, newly crowned Indian Wells champion, in third the round. Despite being the favorite in the fourth round against Petra Kvitová, she showed once again hot and cold performance, winning the first set 6–3, but subsequently losing next two sets with a double bagel.

==== Monterrey Open ====
Coming to her second International tournament of the year at Monterrey Open, Ivanovic won her second title of the year, defeating Urszula Radwańska, Aleksandra Wozniak, 6th seed Magdaléna Rybáriková, 3rd seed and former No. 1 Caroline Wozniacki in semifinals, and Jovana Jakšić in first all-Serbian final.

=== Clay court season ===
==== Fed Cup ====
Fresh off her victory in Monterrey, Ivanovic flew a week later to Bucharest, Romania, for a Fed Cup World Group II Play-offs tie against Romania. Playing in a team without other high-profile players from Serbia, Jelena Janković, who hasn't played Fed Cup since they reached final in 2012, her team wasn't favourite against Romania's team. In her first match, she played against Sorana Cîrstea, and Sorana pulled off a big upset, winning in three sets. Playing now as a non-favorite against No. 5 Simona Halep, Ivanovic made upset herself, beating her in straight sets. However, as Bojana Jovanovski lost both her matches, they were relegated to the Europe/Africa Zone – Zonal Group I in 2015, for the first time since 2008.

This was Ivanovic's seventh straight year that she competed for Serbia's Fed Cup team, and eight overall.

==== Porsche Grand Prix Open ====
Playing at first clay court tournament in Stuttgart, Ivanovic reached quarterfinals for a second straight year, after two wins against Germans, an easy one over No. 14 Sabine Lisicki and hard-fought against wildcard Julia Görges, rallying from first set blowout where she won just one game. Ivanovic continued to show why is clay her best surface, as she beat two-time Slam champion Svetlana Kuznetsova and former No. 1 and current top 10 player at the moment, compatriot Jelena Janković. Being just one step far from winning blue Porsche prize, Ivanovic started very strong against two-time defending champion Maria Sharapova, as she cruised to 5–0 lead with three breaks. Despite having 40–30, she lost three games before eventually winning first set with 6–3. Breaking first again in the second set, she was close to a big lead when having a game point on 3–1, but double fault on that point looked as the key for the falldown which followed it, as she won just two more games to Sharapova's 11. If Ivanovic had won it, it would have been the first time in her career that she won back-to-back titles, as she won Monterrey Open previously, but however, these were even Ivanovic's first back-to-back finals.

==== Mutua Madrid Open ====
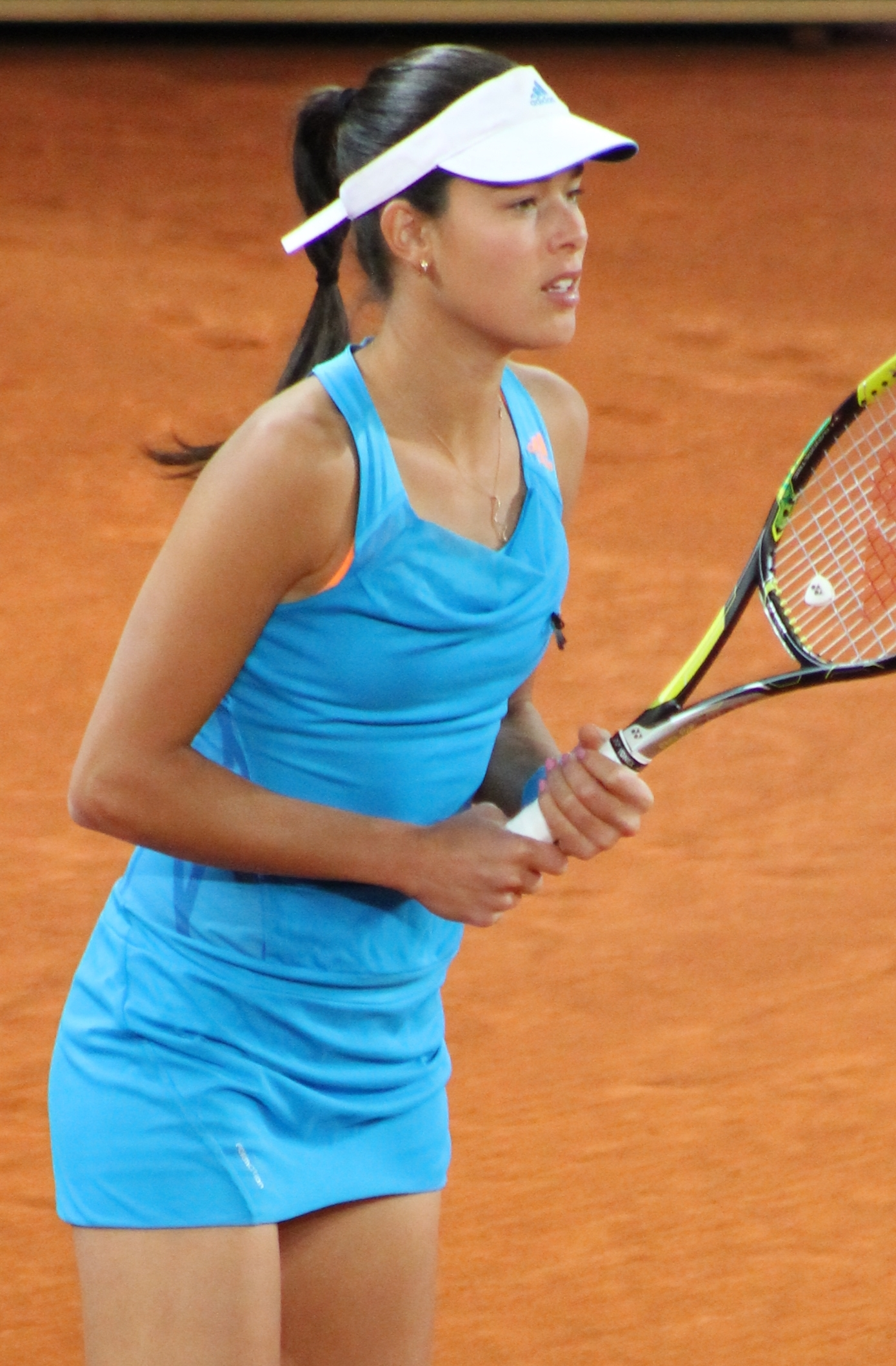
Ivanovic at the Mutua Madrid Open.

Ivanovic followed last year semifinals appearance at Mutua Madrid Open with another good one, reaching quarterfinals after comfortable wins over Madison Keys, Bojana Jovanovski and Anastasia Pavlyuchenkova. Average games per set which she lost in that three rounds was 2,66. She fell then to Simona Halep, losing in an hour and winning just four games.

==== Internazionali BNL d'Italia ====
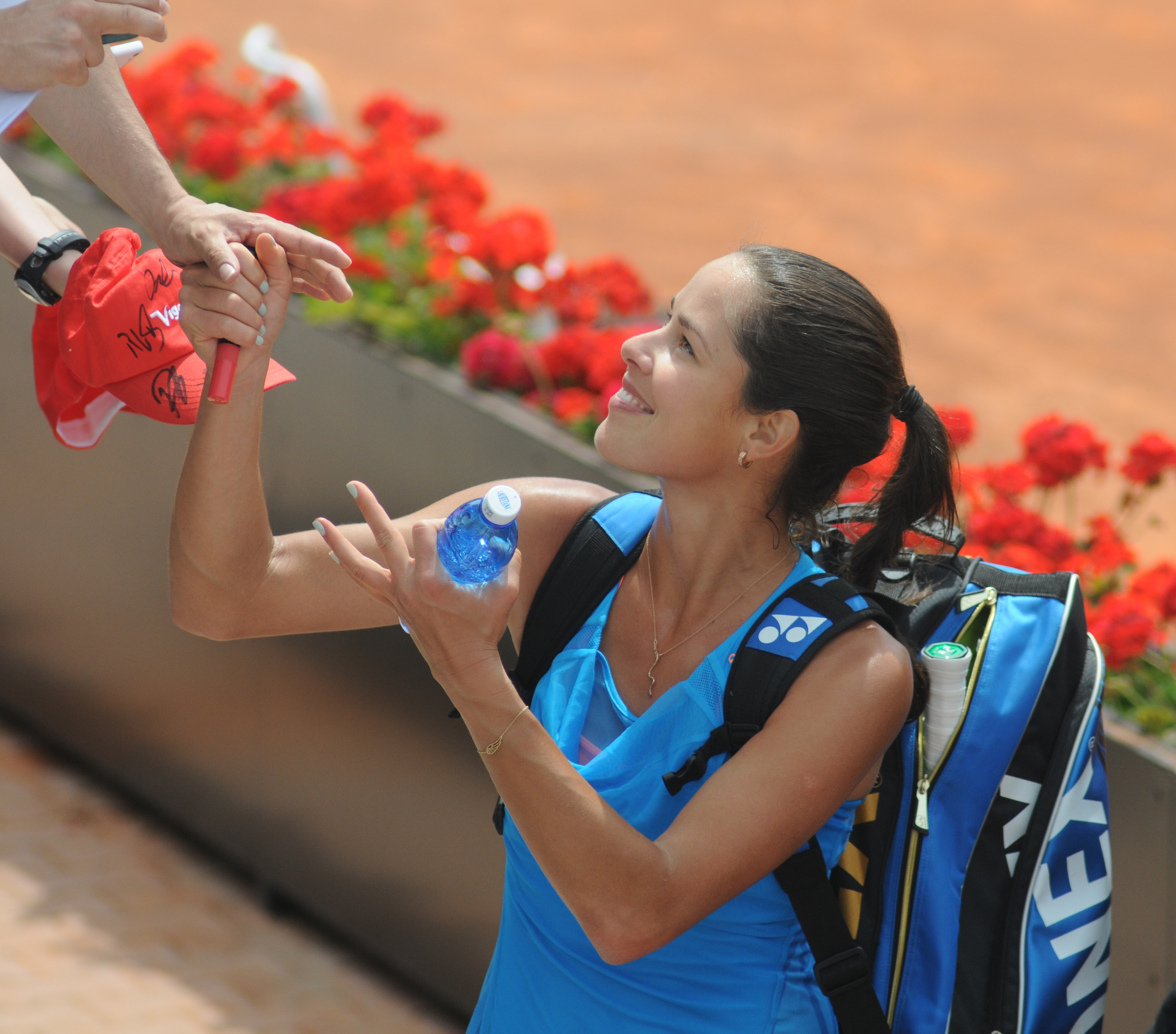
Ivanovic signing autographs at the Internazionali BNL d'Italia.

Continuing to match good results on clay, Ivanovic repeated her best result in Rome – semifinals. First she beat Italian wildcard Karin Knapp with loss of just two games, before having to battle hard for victory over always dangerous Alizé Cornet. In third round she gave revenge from Stuttgart final loss to #7 Maria Sharapova, cruising past Stuttgart & Madrid champion, 6–1, 6–4. The win was significant for a whole host of reasons, but most significantly she became the first player other than Serena Williams to defeat Sharapova on clay since 2011, ended her winning streak in Rome (Sharapova was 47–3 on the surface and was undefeated in Rome since 2011) and was the only player to beat the Russian on clay that year. It was also the first time since the semifinals at the 2007 French Open that Ivanovic had defeated Sharapova. She then won in quarterfinals against clay court specialist Carla Suárez Navarro in three hard sets. In semifinals defending champion Serena Williams awaited. Despite it looked at the start like her win over Serena at Australian Open was coincidence, as she lost first set 6–1, she rebounded fast and showed that it was far from that, as she broke twice for 4–0 lead in second set, and eventually won it 6–3. However, bad start to the third set gave Serena same advantage in second set, and she won it again with 6–1. At the end of the tournament, Ivanovic was however the only player to take set off Williams.

==== French Open ====
Ivanovic came to French Open as one of the title contenders, mostly because of her recent great form on clay and not because of the rankings, as she was yet hanging one place from coming back to top 10. She was seeded 11th, her highest seed at Grand Slam since 2009 US Open, when she was the same seed. From the first moment she proved wherefore she was in that circle of favourites, as she cruised past promising rising star Caroline Garcia, losing just four games against the local French. She followed that with another straight sets victory against Elina Svitolina, player to whom she nearly lost a few months ago in Indian Wells. Next opponent was 23rd seed Lucie Šafářová. The player who beat Ivanovic five times in a row proved to be disadvantageous for Ivanovic, as she struggled throughout the whole match against the lefty and succeeded to win just three games per both sets.

Ivanovic ended up clay court season without a title, which was unfortunate for her as she would have titles on all three surfaces in a season for the first time, as she later won one title on grass with no problems. She put a solid 13–4 record on clay courts (excluding Fed Cup), the even bigger reason why she should have won a title on clay.

=== Grass court season ===
==== Aegon Classic ====
After disappointing French Open, Ivanovic came back strong to grass, winning her first grass court title ever at Aegon Classic, as the first seed. She brushed aside Mona Barthel, Lauren Davis, 6th seed Klára Zakopalová, ninth seed Shuai Zhang and Barbora Záhlavová-Strýcová in final. In all matches, she lost five or less games. Win over Strýcová was even more significant as she later reached Wimbledon quarterfinals with some big upsets. This was her first Premier title since 2008 Linz.

==== Wimbledon Championships ====
Quick work for Premier title on grass at Aegon Classic put Ivanovic again amongst the favourites for Grand Slam title at the Wimbledon Championships. She was again seeded 11th. In the first round, she played against French Open champion Francesca Schiavone and won in two though sets. In the next round, she avenged her 2008 Wimbledon Championships loss to Jie Zheng, as she was shocked then by wildcard Zheng when she was the reigning French Open champion and world No. 1. Now she beat her with few problems, all coming in the first set which she won 6–4, before giving a bagel to Zheng in the second set.

However, on the surface which proved to be her worst through the years, and where she won just her first title this season, grass court specialist and previous year finalist Sabine Lisicki beat her in the next round, giving her another early exit at the Slam, 'early' only because of all she showed throughout the season. Still, Ivanovic lost to the same players just four games in Stuttgart, a few months ago. And also the match showed that Ivanovic was in there all the time, but an early break in the third set turned out to be key as she was giving up over the time the match was closing out. Also, bad conditions played their role in the match, which caused the match to be played over 3 days over the Middle Sunday. First, bad light stopped the match on Saturday when momentum was on Lisicki's side, as she was leading 6–4, 1–1. They continued the match on Monday, and Ivanovic proved to be better one till the rain started, as she won four games and Lisicki one. Rain started to fall on the worst moment for Ivanovic, as she was putting pressure on Sabine's serve, going to deuce a few times before they stopped, and if she won it she would serve first in the third set. When they came back on court after long pause, instead of problems for Lisicki on serve which were before the rain, she blasted two service winners, which were important because she later served first in the decider, and she won eventually 7 of 9 games played in the third part against absent Ivanovic for final score of 6–4, 3–6, 6–1.

All of mentioned facts show that Ivanovic played this year with a lot of pressure at Slams opposite to comfort game at other tournaments, which caused two early exit at Slams and also a bad loss at Australian Open quarterfinals, where she played against inexperienced teenager, at the moment, Eugenie Bouchard, when winning was imperative.

=== US Open series ===
==== Bank of the West Classic ====
In favor of the facts about Ivanovic at the Grand Slams and beside them, soon came a revenge to Lisicki, in her very first match since Wimbledon at Bank of the West Classic, when she won in straight sets. In the next round she lost against Canadian teenager Carol Zhao, losing just two games. In first quarterfinals at Stanford tournament, she played for the third time in a season a three-set match against Serena Williams. Ivanovic won first set convincingly by losing just two games, but eventually lost. Despite losing points, she returned to the world's top 10 for the first time since 2009 French Open as Victoria Azarenka lost more points than Ivanovic. Ironically, it was just Azarenka who replaced Ivanovic then back in 2009 in top 10.

==== Rogers Cup ====
At Rogers Cup, tournament where she was the youngest champion at the time, when she won in 2006, she didn't have such a great time, as she didn't follow convincing win over Timea Bacsinszky against CoCo Vandeweghe in second round, where she missed a chance to close the match out in two tiebreak sets, but then lost next 6–4.

==== Western & Southern Open ====
Ivanovic rebounded back at Western & Southern Open, where she reached her first final of Premier Mandatory or Premier 5 since 2009 Indian Wells Masters. She won her first two matches easily against Sorana Cîrstea and Christina McHale, revenging Fed Cup loss to Cîrstea all the way. In next round she survived hard three-set match against Svetlana Kuznetsova, similar to their previous in Stuttgart. This time Kuznetsova even had a break in decider at 3–1, but after saving a few more crucial break points for Kuznetsova's double break, Ivanovic won five games in a row to close the match out. In quarterfinals she had better time against Elina Svitolina, losing five games and putting perfect head-to-head record against her at 5–0 and also 3–0 in a season.

"No, no, no! She was not there, she missed! It's not right, the point was over."
–Ivanovic arguing with chairumpire after wrong decision which caused her sudden downfall after 6–2, 4–0 lead at that point.
"Is she taking a bathroom break or is she doing a full wardrobe change?"
–asks Sharapova chairumpire during Ivanovic's toilet break before third set.
"Check her blood pressure!"
–Sharapova said toward the chairumpire, tapping the edge of her racquet on the inside of her upper arm, referring to Ana's blood pressure check during 3rd set.
"Many sport fans say back: Check your decibels!"
–twitted Pam Shriver, which refers to Maria's screaming during points.
"I think I ate something bad today. I didn't feel good. They gave me some pills, and after some games it was better."
–Ivanovic told the media in Cincinnati afterwards.
"Players should be fined $2,500 for medical time-outs."
–said Sharapova later.
"I think sometimes some players take too long in between points."
–responded Ivanovic after first round win at US Open.

— Inside details of controversial semifinal Cincinnati match between Ana Ivanovic
and Maria Sharapova, which finished 6–2, 5–7, 7–5 for Ivanovic.

Then in semifinals, Ivanovic was on course for even faster win when she was up 6–2, 4–0, when the match started to get likes of controversial one. When Sharapova was up a break point in that game, Ivanovic hit the line and Sharapova barely returned that ball into part of the net above even end of the doubles court. But as the line judge called out, main judge Felix Torralba immediately corrected it, but said to replay the point. Despite 'she was there' as he said, she hit the ball at the same time they called out and hit it far from Ana's side. Ivanovic even clenched her fist before knowing that they should replay the point, and then insisted that point was hers, but Torralba didn't change the decision. From that moment on Ivanovic looked so distracted and absent, as she hit ball weaker and totally lost her game which brought her massive lead. Despite managing to win one service game which propelled her to a 5–2 lead, it was all of her in the second set, as Sharapova won next five games and a total of 7 games to Ivanovic's 1 since that judge's decision. Ivanovic went to bathroom pause before the third set, and as the pause was getting longer, Sharapova asked the judge whether is she changing wardrobe or she's just on bathroom break. Soon after the third set began, after Ivanovic won first service game, in the middle of Sharapova's service game she started to clutch on herself and hardly walked to her seat ending in tears and then had a timeout – doctors checked they blood pressure to be precise. After that they continued match, and Sharapova then started to scream louder and louder and to scream very loud 'come on' after many points, even after Ivanovic's mistakes. After Sharapova held that game, series of breaks followed, as there was just one hold for both which caused Sharapova to serve for match at 5–4. She saved some break points, and then had two match points, but after missing second, she made two double faults in a row. Ivanovic then saved break point in her game, held it, and won a match on Sharapova's serve on second match point for 6–2, 5–7, 7–5 result. Epic match lasted 2 hours and 46 minutes, and Ivanovic was slightly better in nearly all categories, finishing match with 29 winners to 28, and 45 unforced errors to 51.

In the biggest final in five years, Ivanovic started good with break in the first game against Serena Williams, which she followed to a 3–1 lead. After missing 3 separated break opportunities for two breaks advantage, she lost 11 of the 13 subsequent games.

At the end, Ivanovic didn't win any place at US Open Series as she finished 4th, though she needed just one more win at Rogers Cup which would double her points and propel her to 2nd place.

==== US Open ====
Ivanovic came to US Open as the eight seed, her first top 8 or even top 10 seeding at Slam since 2009 French Open where she was the same seed. She lost just three games against Alison Riske in first round but lost to Karolína Plíšková in the second round in straight sets.

Ivanovic showed for the third straight Slam how nerves can distract player at big stage, and this time she even lost to a player who never before reached third round at Slam.

=== Asian hard court swing ===
==== Toray Pan Pacific Open ====
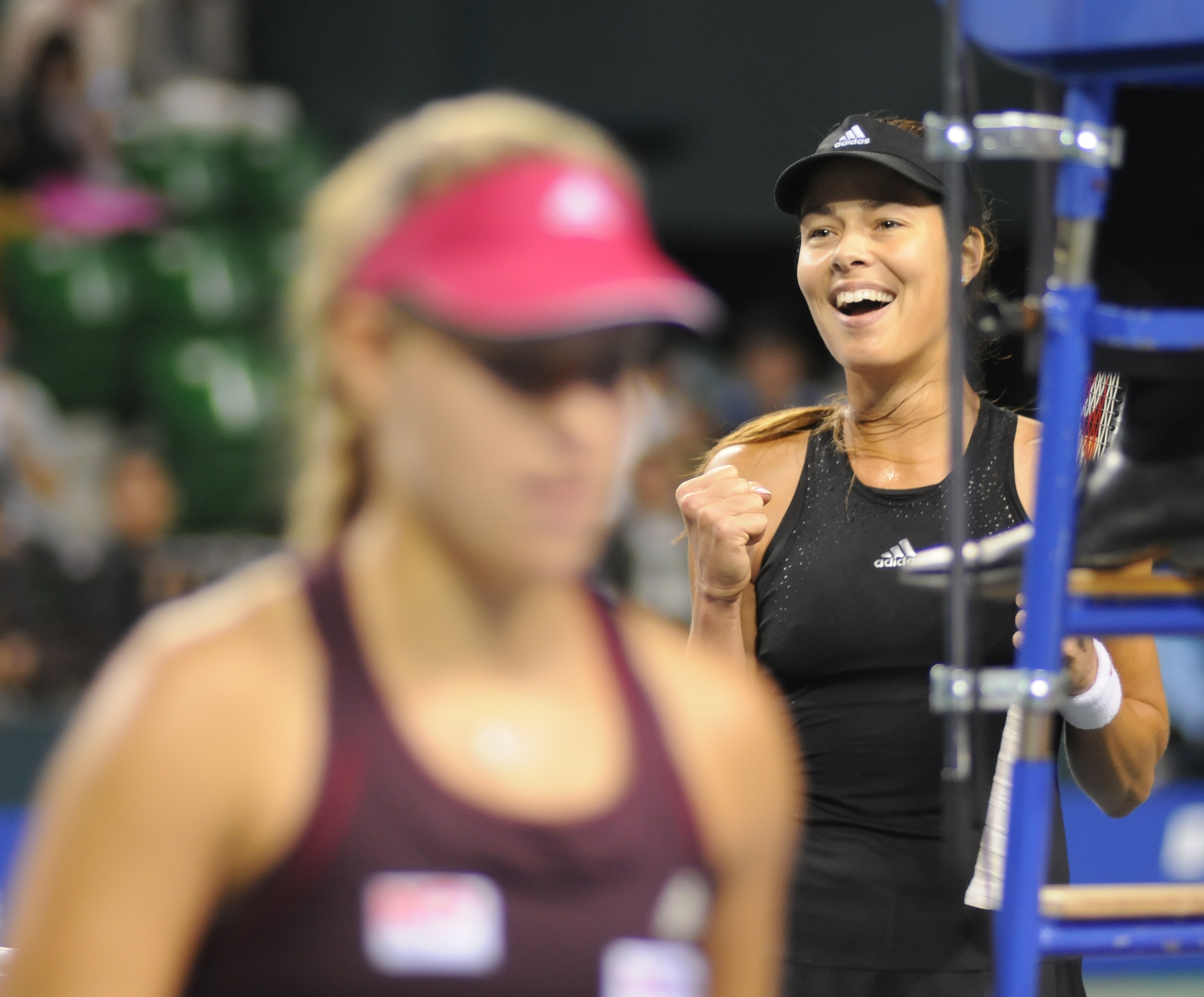
Ivanovic celebrating win over Angelique Kerber in Tokyo semifinals.

Ivanovic returned to confidence again, beating four top players to win fourth title of the season. After receiving first round bye, she beat Victoria Azarenka, Lucie Šafářová (revenging French Open defeat and ending 5 straight matches win streak for Lucie in their matches), and two top ten players, Angelique Kerber who was top seed, and Caroline Wozniacki, second seed and reigning US Open finalist. She didn't drop set all tournament. By reaching final, she set personal best for most finals in a season with six, and by winning title for most titles in a season with four.

==== Wuhan Open ====
Having to play the day after winning Tokyo title in Wuhan, Ivanovic fell to fatigue and was forced to retired in second set against Anastasia Pavlyuchenkova.

==== China Open ====
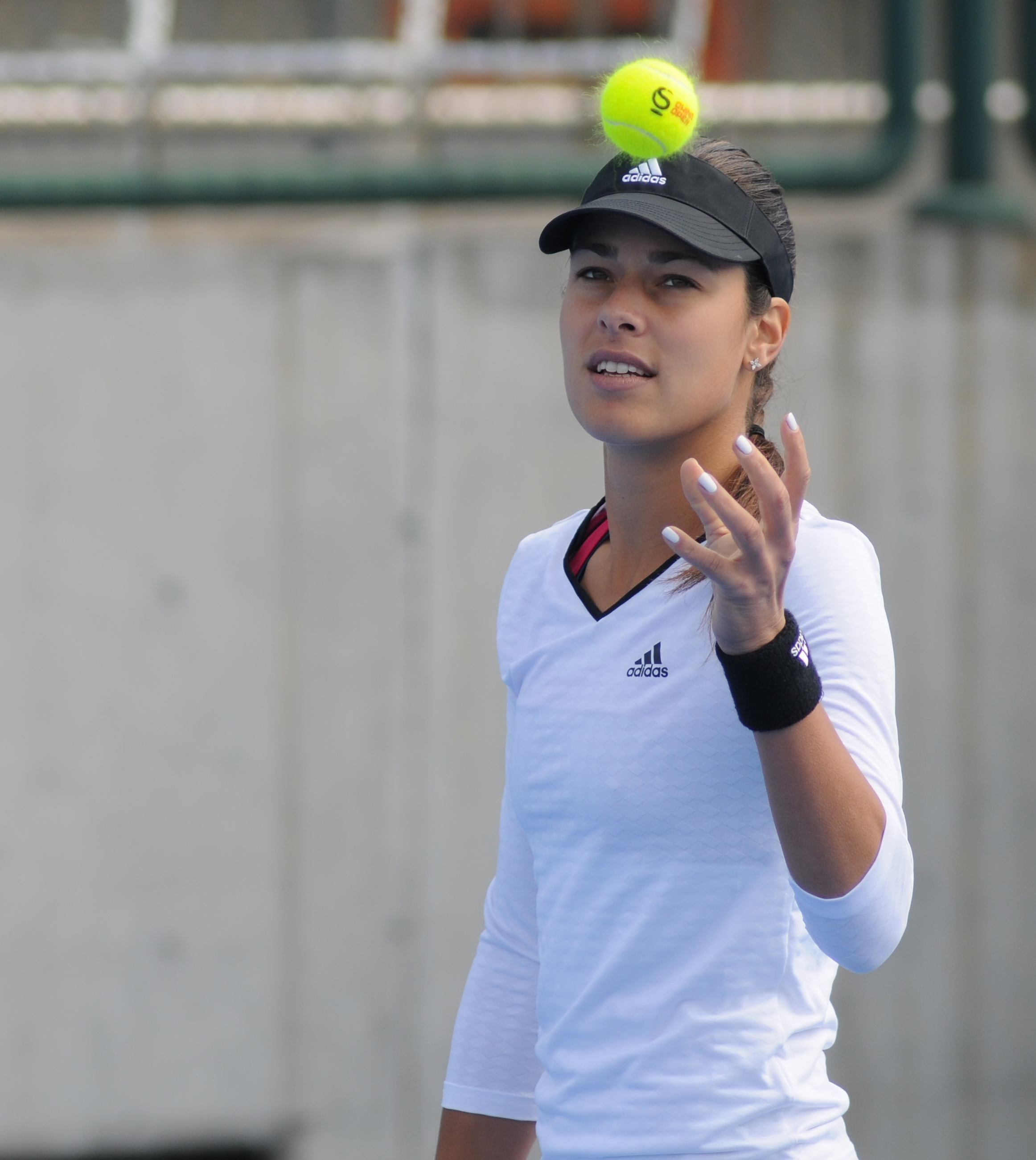
Ivanovic during practise at China Open.

After enough time to rest, Ivanovic came charged to Premier Mandatory event in Beijing, and moved confidently to quarterfinals after defeating US Open quarterfinalist Belinda Bencic, Romina Oprandi and Sabine Lisicki. There she was given a walkover from Simona Halep. In first Beijing semifinals she lost to Maria Sharapova, shockingly easy, after being bageled in first set and winning consolation four games in second set.

=== European indoors and WTA Finals ===
==== Generali Ladies Linz ====
Ivanovic came to Linz with good memories, as she is two-time champion and one more time finalist. But soon after winning first match against Pauline Parmentier, she withdrew from tournament citing a hip injury.

==== WTA Finals ====
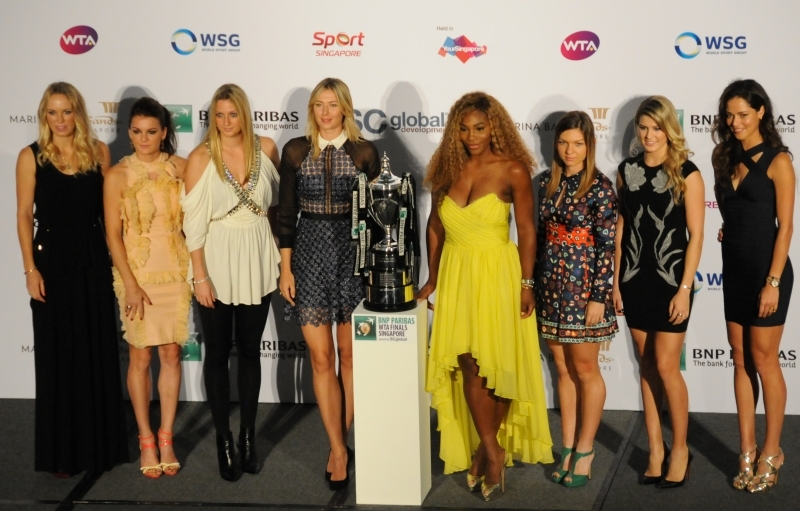
Ivanovic (right) with other competitors at WTA Finals in Singapore.

Ivanovic was drawn into Red Group at WTA Finals along with Serena Williams, Simona Halep and Eugenie Bouchard. First match was against Serena, and she lost for the fourth time in a season to her after her shock win over Serena in Melbourne. Though she lost in two sets, she had one moment in first set to regret when having a break point to serve for the set and missing the ball which Serena couldn't return. In next match she brushed aside Eugenie Bouchard, losing just four games. Ivanovic once again gave a revenge to Grand Slam loss, meaning that she beat all players to whom she lost at Slam ultimately in their next match, excluding Pliskova whom she didn't play against since loss at US Open.

In final round robin match against Simona Halep, Ivanovic needed to win in straight sets to reach semifinals, because both Serena and Halep had two wins and would have more sets then Ivanovic if she even wins in three sets. Ivanovic needed just two set win with no matter of score, because even in worst case (two tiebreaks), she would have had better game percentage than Serena. After Halep was close to crashing Ivanovic's hopes by leading 5–2 and serving, Ivanovic managed somehow to get back and won in tiebreak with 9–7. In second set Halep raced to 4–1, Ivanovic won next two games to get break back, but another break for Halep and hold at love definitely crashed her dreams of returning to WTA Finals semifinal for the first time since debut in 2007, though she had just one more appearance in 2008. However, at least Ivanovic managed to finish season with the won match, with score of 7–6^{(9–7)}, 3–6, 6–3.

This win was Ivanovic's 59th win at WTA Tour, record leading of all players in the season at the end of it, and which ensured Ivanovic finish at the 5th place at the WTA rankings. If she eventually lost the match she would finish at 7th place, giving even bigger importance to Ivanovic's win over Halep. It was Ivanovic's third top 10 finish, along with 2007 and 2008, tough all of that finishes were in the top 5.

== All matches ==
=== Singles matches ===
Tournament	Match	Round	Opponent	Rank	Result	Score
ASB Classic; Auckland, Australia; WTA International; Hard, outdoor 30 December – 4 January 2014	1	1R	(United States) Alison Riske	#57	Win	7–5, 7–6^{(7–2)}
ASB Classic; Auckland, Australia; WTA International; Hard, outdoor 30 December – 4 January 2014	2	2R	(Sweden) Johanna Larsson	#84	Win	6–1, 6–1
ASB Classic; Auckland, Australia; WTA International; Hard, outdoor 30 December – 4 January 2014	3	QF	(Japan) Kurumi Nara	#81	Win	6–2, 6–3
ASB Classic; Auckland, Australia; WTA International; Hard, outdoor 30 December – 4 January 2014	4	SF	(Belgium) Kirsten Flipkens (3)	#20	Win	6–0, 7–6^{(7–3)}
ASB Classic; Auckland, Australia; WTA International; Hard, outdoor 30 December – 4 January 2014	5	F	(United States) Venus Williams	#47	Win (1)	6–2, 5–7, 6–4
Australian Open; Melbourne, Australia; Grand Slam; Hard, outdoor 13–26 January 2014	6	1R	(Netherlands) Kiki Bertens	#93	Win	6–4, 6–4
Australian Open; Melbourne, Australia; Grand Slam; Hard, outdoor 13–26 January 2014	7	2R	(Germany) Annika Beck	#54	Win	6–1, 6–2
Australian Open; Melbourne, Australia; Grand Slam; Hard, outdoor 13–26 January 2014	8	3R	(Australia) Samantha Stosur (17)	#17	Win	6–7^{(7–3)}, 6–4, 6–2
Australian Open; Melbourne, Australia; Grand Slam; Hard, outdoor 13–26 January 2014	9	4R	(United States) Serena Williams (1)	#1	Win	4–6, 6–3, 6–3
Australian Open; Melbourne, Australia; Grand Slam; Hard, outdoor 13–26 January 2014	10	QF	(Canada) Eugenie Bouchard (30)	#31	Loss	7–5, 5–7, 2–6
Qatar Total Open; Doha, Qatar; WTA Premier 5 Hard, outdoor 10–16 February 2014
Qatar Total Open; Doha, Qatar; WTA Premier 5 Hard, outdoor 10–16 February 2014	11	1R	(Slovakia) Daniela Hantuchová	#30	Win	7–5, 1–0, ret.
Qatar Total Open; Doha, Qatar; WTA Premier 5 Hard, outdoor 10–16 February 2014	12	2R	(Czech Republic) Klára Zakopalová	#34	Loss	6–4, 1–6, 3–6
Dubai Tennis Championships; Dubai, United Arab Emirates; WTA Premier; Hard, outdoor 17–22 February 2014
Dubai Tennis Championships; Dubai, United Arab Emirates; WTA Premier; Hard, outdoor 17–22 February 2014	13	1R	(Germany) Angelique Kerber (6)	#8	Win	3–6, 6–3, 7–6^{(8–6)}
Dubai Tennis Championships; Dubai, United Arab Emirates; WTA Premier; Hard, outdoor 17–22 February 2014	14	2R	(United States) Venus Williams (WC)	#44	Loss	2–6, 1–6
BNP Paribas Open; Indian Wells, United States; WTA Premier Mandatory; Hard, outdoor 3–16 March 2014	–	1R	Bye			
BNP Paribas Open; Indian Wells, United States; WTA Premier Mandatory; Hard, outdoor 3–16 March 2014	15	2R	(Ukraine) Elina Svitolina	#44	Win	4–6, 7–5, 7–6^{(7–1)}
BNP Paribas Open; Indian Wells, United States; WTA Premier Mandatory; Hard, outdoor 3–16 March 2014	16	3R	(United States) Sloane Stephens (17)	#18	Loss	6–7^{(3–7)}, 4–6
Sony Open Tennis; Miami, United States; WTA Premier Mandatory; Hard, outdoor 17–30 March 2014	–	1R	Bye			
Sony Open Tennis; Miami, United States; WTA Premier Mandatory; Hard, outdoor 17–30 March 2014	17	2R	(United States) Lauren Davis	#55	Win	6–1, 6–1
Sony Open Tennis; Miami, United States; WTA Premier Mandatory; Hard, outdoor 17–30 March 2014	18	3R	(Italy) Flavia Pennetta (20)	#12	Win	6–4, 6–3
Sony Open Tennis; Miami, United States; WTA Premier Mandatory; Hard, outdoor 17–30 March 2014	19	4R	(Czech Republic) Petra Kvitová (8)	#8	Loss	6–3, 0–6, 0–6
Monterrey Open; Monterrey, Mexico; WTA International; Hard, outdoor 31 March – 6 April 2014	20	1R	(Poland) Urszula Radwańska	#65	Win	4–6, 6–3, 6–3
Monterrey Open; Monterrey, Mexico; WTA International; Hard, outdoor 31 March – 6 April 2014	21	2R	(Canada) Aleksandra Wozniak (Q)	#172	Win	6–4, 6–2
Monterrey Open; Monterrey, Mexico; WTA International; Hard, outdoor 31 March – 6 April 2014	22	QF	(Slovakia) Magdaléna Rybáriková (6)	#38	Win	6–1, 0–6, 6–2
Monterrey Open; Monterrey, Mexico; WTA International; Hard, outdoor 31 March – 6 April 2014	23	SF	(Denmark) Caroline Wozniacki (3)	#14	Win	7–6^{(7–5)}, 6–4
Monterrey Open; Monterrey, Mexico; WTA International; Hard, outdoor 31 March – 6 April 2014	24	F	(Serbia) Jovana Jakšić	#137	Win (2)	6–2, 6–1
Fed Cup Play-offs: Serbia vs. Romania; Bucharest, Romania; Fed Cup; Clay, outdoor April 19–20, 2014	25	–	(Romania) Sorana Cîrstea	N/A	Loss	6–3, 1–6, 2–6
Fed Cup Play-offs: Serbia vs. Romania; Bucharest, Romania; Fed Cup; Clay, outdoor April 19–20, 2014	26	–	(Romania) Simona Halep	#5	Win	6–3, 7–6^{(7–2)}
Porsche Tennis Grand Prix; Stuttgart, Germany; WTA Premier; Clay, indoor 21–27 April 2014
Porsche Tennis Grand Prix; Stuttgart, Germany; WTA Premier; Clay, indoor 21–27 April 2014	27	1R	(Germany) Sabine Lisicki	#14	Win	6–1, 6–3
Porsche Tennis Grand Prix; Stuttgart, Germany; WTA Premier; Clay, indoor 21–27 April 2014	28	2R	(Germany) Julia Görges (WC)	#94	Win	1–6, 6–2, 6–3
Porsche Tennis Grand Prix; Stuttgart, Germany; WTA Premier; Clay, indoor 21–27 April 2014	29	QF	(Russia) Svetlana Kuznetsova	#29	Win	6–3, 2–6, 6–4
Porsche Tennis Grand Prix; Stuttgart, Germany; WTA Premier; Clay, indoor 21–27 April 2014	30	SF	(Serbia) Jelena Janković (5)	#8	Win	6–3, 7–5
Porsche Tennis Grand Prix; Stuttgart, Germany; WTA Premier; Clay, indoor 21–27 April 2014	31	F	(Russia) Maria Sharapova (6)	#9	Loss (1)	6–3, 4–6, 1–6
Mutua Madrid Open; Madrid, Spain; WTA Premier Mandatory; Clay, outdoor 5–11 May 2014	32	1R	(United States) Madison Keys	#44	Win	6–1, 7–6^{(7–4)}
Mutua Madrid Open; Madrid, Spain; WTA Premier Mandatory; Clay, outdoor 5–11 May 2014	33	2R	(Serbia) Bojana Jovanovski	#40	Win	6–4, 6–2
Mutua Madrid Open; Madrid, Spain; WTA Premier Mandatory; Clay, outdoor 5–11 May 2014	34	3R	(Russia) Anastasia Pavlyuchenkova	#26	Win	6–1, 6–2
Mutua Madrid Open; Madrid, Spain; WTA Premier Mandatory; Clay, outdoor 5–11 May 2014	35	QF	(Romania) Simona Halep (4)	#5	Loss	2–6, 2–6
Internazionali BNL d'Italia; Rome, Italy; WTA Premier 5 Clay, outdoor 12–18 May 2014	36	1R	(Italy) Karin Knapp (WC)	#51	Win	6–1, 6–1
Internazionali BNL d'Italia; Rome, Italy; WTA Premier 5 Clay, outdoor 12–18 May 2014	37	2R	(France) Alizé Cornet	#21	Win	7–6^{(7–1)}, 7–5
Internazionali BNL d'Italia; Rome, Italy; WTA Premier 5 Clay, outdoor 12–18 May 2014	38	3R	(Russia) Maria Sharapova (8)	#7	Win	6–1, 6–4
Internazionali BNL d'Italia; Rome, Italy; WTA Premier 5 Clay, outdoor 12–18 May 2014	39	QF	(Spain) Carla Suárez Navarro (14)	#14	Win	6–4, 3–6, 6–4
Internazionali BNL d'Italia; Rome, Italy; WTA Premier 5 Clay, outdoor 12–18 May 2014	40	SF	(United States) Serena Williams (1)	#1	Loss	1–6, 6–3, 1–6
French Open; Paris, France; Grand Slam; Clay, outdoor 25 May – 8 June 2014	41	1R	(France) Caroline Garcia	#43	Win	6–1, 6–3
French Open; Paris, France; Grand Slam; Clay, outdoor 25 May – 8 June 2014	42	2R	(Ukraine) Elina Svitolina	#33	Win	7–5, 6–2
French Open; Paris, France; Grand Slam; Clay, outdoor 25 May – 8 June 2014	43	3R	(Czech Republic) Lucie Šafářová (23)	#24	Loss	3–6, 3–6
Aegon Classic; Birmingham, United Kingdom; WTA Premier; Grass, outdoor 16–21 June 2014	–	1R	Bye			
Aegon Classic; Birmingham, United Kingdom; WTA Premier; Grass, outdoor 16–21 June 2014	44	2R	(Germany) Mona Barthel	#57	Win	6–4, 6–1
Aegon Classic; Birmingham, United Kingdom; WTA Premier; Grass, outdoor 16–21 June 2014	45	3R	(United States) Lauren Davis	#61	Win	6–1, 6–1
Aegon Classic; Birmingham, United Kingdom; WTA Premier; Grass, outdoor 16–21 June 2014	46	QF	(Czech Republic) Klára Zakopalová (6)	#33	Win	6–1, 6–4
Aegon Classic; Birmingham, United Kingdom; WTA Premier; Grass, outdoor 16–21 June 2014	47	SF	(China) Shuai Zhang (9)	#36	Win	6–2, 6–2
Aegon Classic; Birmingham, United Kingdom; WTA Premier; Grass, outdoor 16–21 June 2014	48	F	(Czech Republic) Barbora Záhlavová-Strýcová	#62	Win (3)	6–3, 6–2
Wimbledon Championships; London, United Kingdom; Grand Slam; Grass, outdoor 23 June – 6 July 2014	49	1R	(Italy) Francesca Schiavone	#76	Win	7–6^{(8–6)}, 6–4
Wimbledon Championships; London, United Kingdom; Grand Slam; Grass, outdoor 23 June – 6 July 2014	50	2R	(China) Jie Zheng	#66	Win	6–4, 6–0
Wimbledon Championships; London, United Kingdom; Grand Slam; Grass, outdoor 23 June – 6 July 2014	51	3R	(Germany) Sabine Lisicki (19)	#19	Loss	4–6, 6–3, 1–6
Bank of the West Classic; Stanford, United States; WTA Premier; Clay, outdoor 28 July – 3 August 2014	52	1R	(Germany) Sabine Lisicki	#29	Win	7–6^{(7–2)}, 6–1
Bank of the West Classic; Stanford, United States; WTA Premier; Clay, outdoor 28 July – 3 August 2014	53	2R	(Canada) Carol Zhao (Q)	#421	Win	6–1, 6–1
Bank of the West Classic; Stanford, United States; WTA Premier; Clay, outdoor 28 July – 3 August 2014	54	QF	(United States) Serena Williams (1)	#1	Loss	6–2, 3–6, 5–7
Rogers Cup; Montreal, Canada; WTA Premier 5 Hard, outdoor 4–10 August 2014
Rogers Cup; Montreal, Canada; WTA Premier 5 Hard, outdoor 4–10 August 2014	55	1R	(Switzerland) Timea Bacsinszky (Q)	#82	Win	6–1, 6–2
Rogers Cup; Montreal, Canada; WTA Premier 5 Hard, outdoor 4–10 August 2014	56	2R	(United States) CoCo Vandeweghe (Q)	#51	Loss	7–6^{(9–7)}, 6–7^{(7–9)}, 4–6
Western & Southern Open; Cincinnati, United States; WTA Premier 5 Hard, outdoor 11–17 August 2014	57	1R	(Romania) Sorana Cîrstea	#80	Win	6–1, 7–5
Western & Southern Open; Cincinnati, United States; WTA Premier 5 Hard, outdoor 11–17 August 2014	58	2R	(United States) Christina McHale (WC)	#45	Win	6–4, 6–0
Western & Southern Open; Cincinnati, United States; WTA Premier 5 Hard, outdoor 11–17 August 2014	59	3R	(Russia) Svetlana Kuznetsova	#24	Win	6–2, 2–6, 6–3
Western & Southern Open; Cincinnati, United States; WTA Premier 5 Hard, outdoor 11–17 August 2014	60	QF	(Ukraine) Elina Svitolina	#39	Win	6–2, 6–3
Western & Southern Open; Cincinnati, United States; WTA Premier 5 Hard, outdoor 11–17 August 2014	61	SF	(Russia) Maria Sharapova (5)	#6	Win	6–2, 5–7, 7–5
Western & Southern Open; Cincinnati, United States; WTA Premier 5 Hard, outdoor 11–17 August 2014	62	F	(United States) Serena Williams (1)	#1	Loss (2)	4–6, 1–6
US Open; New York City, United States; Grand Slam; Hard, outdoor 25 August – 8 September 2014	63	1R	(United States) Alison Riske	#45	Win	6–3, 6–0
US Open; New York City, United States; Grand Slam; Hard, outdoor 25 August – 8 September 2014	64	2R	(Czech Republic) Karolína Plíšková	#42	Loss	5–7, 4–6
Toray Pan Pacific Open; Tokyo, Japan; WTA Premier; Hard, outdoor 15–21 September 2014	–	1R	Bye			
Toray Pan Pacific Open; Tokyo, Japan; WTA Premier; Hard, outdoor 15–21 September 2014	65	2R	(Belarus) Victoria Azarenka	#25	Win	6–3, 6–4
Toray Pan Pacific Open; Tokyo, Japan; WTA Premier; Hard, outdoor 15–21 September 2014	66	QF	(Czech Republic) Lucie Šafářová (7)	#15	Win	6–3, 6–2
Toray Pan Pacific Open; Tokyo, Japan; WTA Premier; Hard, outdoor 15–21 September 2014	67	SF	(Germany) Angelique Kerber (1)	#8	Win	7–5, 6–3
Toray Pan Pacific Open; Tokyo, Japan; WTA Premier; Hard, outdoor 15–21 September 2014	68	F	(Denmark) Caroline Wozniacki (2)	#9	Win (4)	6–2, 7–6^{(7–2)}
Wuhan Open; Wuhan, China; WTA Premier 5 Hard; 21–27 September 2014	69	1R	(Russia) Anastasia Pavlyuchenkova	#30	Loss	5–7, 5–6, ret.
China Open; Beijing, China; WTA Premier Mandatory; Hard, outdoor 27 September – 5 October 2014	70	1R	(Switzerland) Belinda Bencic (Q)	#34	Win	6–2, 6–1
China Open; Beijing, China; WTA Premier Mandatory; Hard, outdoor 27 September – 5 October 2014	71	2R	(Switzerland) Romina Oprandi (PR)	#149	Win	6–4, 6–2
China Open; Beijing, China; WTA Premier Mandatory; Hard, outdoor 27 September – 5 October 2014	72	3R	(Germany) Sabine Lisicki	#25	Win	6–3, 7–5
China Open; Beijing, China; WTA Premier Mandatory; Hard, outdoor 27 September – 5 October 2014	–	QF	(Romania) Simona Halep (2)	#2	Walkover	
China Open; Beijing, China; WTA Premier Mandatory; Hard, outdoor 27 September – 5 October 2014	73	SF	(Russia) Maria Sharapova (4)	#4	Loss	0–6, 4–6
Generali Ladies Linz; Linz, Austria; WTA International; Hard, indoor 6–12 October 2014	74	1R	(France) Pauline Parmentier	#75	Win	6–3, 6–2
Generali Ladies Linz; Linz, Austria; WTA International; Hard, indoor 6–12 October 2014	–	2R	(United States) Madison Brengle (Q)	#96	Walkover	
WTA Finals; Singapore, Singapore; Year-End Championship; Hard, indoor 20–26 October 2014	75	RR	(United States) Serena Williams (1)	#1	Loss	4–6, 4–6
WTA Finals; Singapore, Singapore; Year-End Championship; Hard, indoor 20–26 October 2014	76	RR	(Canada) Eugenie Bouchard (5)	#5	Win	6–1, 6–3
WTA Finals; Singapore, Singapore; Year-End Championship; Hard, indoor 20–26 October 2014	77	RR	(Romania) Simona Halep (4)	#4	Win	7–6^{(9–7)}, 3–6, 6–3

=== Doubles matches ===
Tournament	Match	Round	Partner	Opponents	Rank	Result	Score
ASB Classic; Auckland, Australia; Grand Slam; Hard, outdoor 30 December – 4 January 2014	1	1R	(Belgium) Kirsten Flipkens	(United States) Irina Falconi (Czech Republic) Eva Hrdinová	170	Win	4–6, 6–3, [11–9]
ASB Classic; Auckland, Australia; Grand Slam; Hard, outdoor 30 December – 4 January 2014	2	QF	(Belgium) Kirsten Flipkens	(Czech Republic) Lucie Hradecká (Netherlands) Michaëlla Krajicek (3)	128	Loss	6–3, 4–6, [3–10]
Sony Open Tennis; Miami, United States; WTA Premier Mandatory; Hard, outdoor 17–30 March 2014	3	1R	(Belgium) Kirsten Flipkens	(Slovakia) Janette Husárová (Czech Republic) Iveta Melzer	361	Loss	5–7, 4–6

=== Exhibitions ===
==== The Energi Danmark Champions Battle ====
Tournament	Opponent	Rank	Result	Score
The Energi Danmark Champions Battle; Herning, Denmark; Exhibition; Hard, indoor 19 November 2014
The Energi Danmark Champions Battle; Herning, Denmark; Exhibition; Hard, indoor 19 November 2014	(United States) Serena Williams	#1	Win	6–4, 6–4

==== International Premier Tennis League ====
Tournament	Opponent's team	Opponent	Rank	Result	Score	Team result
International Premier Tennis League; New Delhi, India; Manila, Philippines; Singapore; Dubai, UAE; Team event Team: Indian Aces; Hard, indoor 28 November – 13 December 2014	Singapore Slammers	(Slovakia) Daniela Hantuchová	#64	Win	6–0	Win (26–16)
International Premier Tennis League; New Delhi, India; Manila, Philippines; Singapore; Dubai, UAE; Team event Team: Indian Aces; Hard, indoor 28 November – 13 December 2014	(Philippines) Manila Mavericks	(Russia) Maria Sharapova	#2	Win	6–3	Win (24–15)
International Premier Tennis League; New Delhi, India; Manila, Philippines; Singapore; Dubai, UAE; Team event Team: Indian Aces; Hard, indoor 28 November – 13 December 2014	(United Arab Emirates) UAE Royals	(France) Kristina Mladenovic	#81	Loss	4–6	Win (28–20)
International Premier Tennis League; New Delhi, India; Manila, Philippines; Singapore; Dubai, UAE; Team event Team: Indian Aces; Hard, indoor 28 November – 13 December 2014	UAE Royals	(France) Kristina Mladenovic	#81	Win	6–2	Win (30–11)
International Premier Tennis League; New Delhi, India; Manila, Philippines; Singapore; Dubai, UAE; Team event Team: Indian Aces; Hard, indoor 28 November – 13 December 2014	Singapore Slammers	(United States) Serena Williams	#1	Loss	4–6	Loss (23–24)
International Premier Tennis League; New Delhi, India; Manila, Philippines; Singapore; Dubai, UAE; Team event Team: Indian Aces; Hard, indoor 28 November – 13 December 2014	(Philippines) Manila Mavericks	(Belgium) Kirsten Flipkens	#46	Win	6–2	Loss (20–25)
International Premier Tennis League; New Delhi, India; Manila, Philippines; Singapore; Dubai, UAE; Team event Team: Indian Aces; Hard, indoor 28 November – 13 December 2014	(Philippines) Manila Mavericks	(Belgium) Kirsten Flipkens	#46	Win	6–2	Win (26–25)
International Premier Tennis League; New Delhi, India; Manila, Philippines; Singapore; Dubai, UAE; Team event Team: Indian Aces; Hard, indoor 28 November – 13 December 2014	Singapore Slammers	(Slovakia) Daniela Hantuchová	#64	Win	6–5^{(7–5)}	Win (26–16)
International Premier Tennis League; New Delhi, India; Manila, Philippines; Singapore; Dubai, UAE; Team event Team: Indian Aces; Hard, indoor 28 November – 13 December 2014	UAE Royals	(France) Kristina Mladenovic	#81	Loss	5–6	Loss (22–29)
International Premier Tennis League; New Delhi, India; Manila, Philippines; Singapore; Dubai, UAE; Team event Team: Indian Aces; Hard, indoor 28 November – 13 December 2014	Singapore Slammers	(Slovakia) Daniela Hantuchová	#64	Win	6–5^{(9–3)}	Win (28–24)
International Premier Tennis League; New Delhi, India; Manila, Philippines; Singapore; Dubai, UAE; Team event Team: Indian Aces; Hard, indoor 28 November – 13 December 2014	(Philippines) Manila Mavericks	(Belgium) Kirsten Flipkens	#46	Win	6–3	Win (28–13)
International Premier Tennis League; New Delhi, India; Manila, Philippines; Singapore; Dubai, UAE; Team event Team: Indian Aces; Hard, indoor 28 November – 13 December 2014	UAE Royals	(France) Kristina Mladenovic	#81	Win	6–5	Loss (15–29)
Total (team)	Final result: Champions (decided by most games won throughout the event and in case of tie by games won percantage – here Indian Aces won with most games won)				54.61% (team)	296–246

== Tournament schedule ==
=== Singles schedule ===
Ivanovic's 2014 singles tournament schedule is as follows:

Date	Championship	Location	Category	Surface	Points	Outcome
30 December 2013 – 4 January 2014	ASB Classic	Auckland	WTA International	Hard	280	Winner defeated (United States) V Williams, 6–2, 5–7, 6–4
13 January – 26 January	Australian Open	Melbourne	Grand Slam	Hard	430	Quarterfinals lost to (Canada) E Bouchard, 7–5, 5–7, 2–6
10 February – 16 February	Qatar Total Open	Doha	WTA Premier 5	Hard	60	Second Round lost to (Czech Republic) K Zakopalová, 6–4, 1–6, 3–6
17 February – 22 February	Dubai Tennis Championships	Dubai	WTA Premier	Hard	55	Second Round lost to (United States) V Williams, 2–6, 1–6
3 March – 16 March	BNP Paribas Open	Miami	WTA Premier Mandatory	Hard	65	Third Round lost to (United States) S Stephens, 6–7^{(3–7)}, 4–6
17 March – 30 March	Sony Open Tennis	Miami	WTA Premier Mandatory	Hard	120	Fourth Round lost to (Czech Republic) P Kvitová, 6–3, 0–6, 0–6
31 March – 6 April	Monterrey Open	Monterrey	WTA International	Hard	280	Winner defeated (Serbia) J Jakšić, 6–2, 6–1
19 April – 20 April	Fed Cup WG II Play-offs: Serbia vs. Romania	Bucharest	Fed Cup	Clay		Romania def. Serbia, 4–1; Serbia was relegated to Zonal Group I in 2015
21 April – 27 April	Porsche Tennis Grand Prix	Stuttgart	WTA Premier	Clay (i)	305	Final lost to (Russia) M Sharapova, 6–3, 4–6, 1–6
5 May – 11 May	Mutua Madrid Open	Madrid	WTA Premier Mandatory	Clay	215	Quarterfinals lost to (Romania) S Halep, 2–6, 2–6
12 May – 18 May	Internazionali BNL d'Italia	Rome	WTA Premier 5	Clay	350	Semifinals lost to (United States) S Williams, 1–6, 6–3, 1–6
24 May – 7 June	French Open	Paris	Grand Slam	Clay	130	Third Round lost to (Czech Republic) L Šafářová, 3–6, 3–6
16 June – 21 June	Aegon Classic	Birmingham	WTA Premier	Hard	470	Winner defeated (Czech Republic) B Záhlavová-Strýcová, 6–3, 6–2
23 June – 6 July	Wimbledon	London	Grand Slam	Grass	130	Third Round lost to (Germany) S Lisicki, 4–6, 6–3, 1–6
28 July – 3 August	Bank of the West Classic	Stanford	WTA Premier	Hard	100	Quarterfinals lost to (United States) S Williams, 6–2, 3–6, 5–7
4 August – 10 August	Rogers Cup	Canada	WTA Premier 5	Hard	60	Second Round lost to (United States) C Vandeweghe, 7–6^{(9–7)}, 6–7^{(7–9)}, 4–6
11 August – 17 August	Western & Southern Open	Cincinnati	WTA Premier 5	Hard	585	Final lost to (United States) Serena Williams, 4–6, 1–6
25 August – 8 September	US Open	New York	Grand Slam	Hard	70	Second Round lost to (Czech Republic) K Plíšková, 5–7, 4–6
15 September – 21 September	Toray Pan Pacific Open	Tokyo	WTA Premier	Hard	470	Winner defeated (Denmark) C Wozniacki, 6–2, 7–6^{(7–2)}
21 September – 27 September	Wuhan Open	Wuhan	WTA Premier 5	Hard	1	First Round lost to (Russia) Pavlyuchenkova, 5–7, 5–6, ret.
29 September – 5 October	China Open	Beijing	WTA Premier Mandatory	Hard	390	Semifinals lost to (Russia) M Sharapova, 0–6, 4–6
6 October – 12 October	Generali Ladies Linz	Linz	WTA International	Hard	30	Second Round; Withdrew before match against (United States) M Brengle
20 October – 26 October	WTA Finals	Singapore	Year-End Championships	Hard (i)	530	Round robin (lost to (United States) S Williams, 4–6, 4–6) (def. (Canada) E Bouchard, 6–1, 6–3) (def. (Romania) S Halep, 7–6^{(9–7)}, 3–6, 6–3)
Total year-end points					4850	

=== Doubles schedule ===
Ivanovic's 2013 doubles tournament schedule is as follows:

Date	Championship	Location	Category	Surface	Points	Outcome
30 December – 4 January	ASB Classic	Auckland	WTA International	Hard	60	Quarterfinals lost to (Czech Republic) L Hradecká/ (Netherlands) M Krajicek; 6–3, 4–6, [3–10]
17 March – 30 March	Sony Open Tennis	Miami	WTA Premier Mandatory	Hard	10	First Round lost to (Slovakia) Janette Husárová/ (Czech Republic) I Melzer; 5–7, 4–6
Total year-end points					70	Partner: (Belgium) Kirsten Flipkens

== Yearly records ==
=== Head-to-head matchups ===
Ordered by percentage of wins, as of WTA Tour Championships

- (Ukraine) Elina Svitolina 3–0
- (United States) Lauren Davis 2–0
- (Germany) Angelique Kerber 2–0
- (Russia) Svetlana Kuznetsova 2–0
- (United States) Alison Riske 2–0
- (Denmark) Caroline Wozniacki 2–0
- (Belarus) Victoria Azarenka 1–0
- (Switzerland) Timea Bacsinszky 1–0
- (Germany) Mona Barthel 1–0
- (Germany) Annika Beck 1–0
- (Switzerland) Belinda Bencic 1–0
- (Netherlands) Kiki Bertens 1–0
- (France) Alizé Cornet 1–0
- (Belgium) Kirsten Flipkens 1–0
- (France) Caroline Garcia 1–0
- (Germany) Julia Görges 1–0
- (Slovakia) Daniela Hantuchová 1–0
- (Serbia) Jovana Jakšić 1–0
- (Serbia) Jelena Janković 1–0
- (Serbia) Bojana Jovanovski 1–0
- (United States) Madison Keys 1–0
- (Italy) Karin Knapp 1–0
- (Sweden) Johanna Larsson 1–0
- (United States) Christina McHale 1–0
- (Japan) Kurumi Nara 1–0
- (Spain) Carla Suárez Navarro 1–0
- (Switzerland) Romina Oprandi 1–0
- (France) Pauline Parmentier 1–0
- (Italy) Flavia Pennetta 1–0
- (Poland) Urszula Radwańska 1–0
- (Slovakia) Magdaléna Rybáriková 1–0
- (Italy) Francesca Schiavone 1–0
- (Australia) Samantha Stosur 1–0
- (Canada) Aleksandra Wozniak 1–0
- (China) Shuai Zhang 1–0
- (Czech Republic) Barbora Záhlavová-Strýcová 1–0
- (Canada) Carol Zhao 1–0
- (China) Jie Zheng 1–0
- (Germany) Sabine Lisicki 3–1
- (Romania) Simona Halep 2–1
- (Russia) Maria Sharapova 2–2
- (Canada) Eugenie Bouchard 1–1
- (Romania) Sorana Cîrstea 1–1
- (Russia) Anastasia Pavlyuchenkova 1–1
- (Czech Republic) Lucie Šafářová 1–1
- (United States) Venus Williams 1–1
- (Czech Republic) Klára Zakopalová 1–1
- (United States) Serena Williams 1–4
- (Czech Republic) Petra Kvitová 0–1
- (Czech Republic) Karolína Plíšková 0–1
- (United States) Sloane Stephens 0–1
- (United States) CoCo Vandeweghe 0–1

=== Finals ===
==== Singles: 6 (4–2) ====
Winner — Legend Grand Slam tournaments (0–0) WTA Tour Championships (0–0) Premier Mandatory (0–0) Premier 5 (0–1) Premier (2–1) International (2–0)	Titles by Surface Hard (3–1) Grass (1–0) Clay (0–1)	Finals by venue Outdoors (4–2) Indoors (0–0)

Outcome	No.	Date	Championship	Surface	Opponent in the final	Score in the final
Winner	12.	January 4, 2014	Auckland Open, Auckland, New Zealand	Hard	(United States) Venus Williams	6–2, 5–7, 6–4
Winner	13.	April 6, 2014	Monterrey Open, Monterrey, Mexico	Hard	(Serbia) Jovana Jakšić	6–2, 6–1
Runner-up	6.	April 27, 2014	Stuttgart Open, Stuttgart, Germany	Clay (i)	(Russia) Maria Sharapova	6–3, 4–6, 1–6
Winner	14.	June 15, 2014	Birmingham Classic, Birmingham, United Kingdom	Grass	(Czech Republic) Barbora Strýcová	6–3, 6–2
Runner-up	7.	August 17, 2014	Cincinnati Masters, Cincinnati, United States	Hard	(United States) Serena Williams	4–6, 1–6
Winner	15.	September 21, 2014	Pan Pacific Open, Tokyo, Japan	Hard	(Denmark) Caroline Wozniacki	6–2, 7–6^{(7–2)}

=== Earnings ===
#	Event	Prize money	Year-to-date
1	ASB Classic (singles)	$43,000	$43,000
1	ASB Classic (doubles)	$910	$43,910
2	Australian Open	$239,365	$283,275
3	Qatar Total Open	$12,900	$296,175
4	Dubai Tennis Championships	$18,712	$314,887
5	BNP Paribas Open	$28,000	$342,887
6	Sony Open Tennis (singles)	$51,730	$394,617
6	Sony Open Tennis (doubles)	$4,535	$399,152
7	Monterrey Open	$111,389	$510,541
8	Porsche Tennis Grand Prix	$64,000	$574,541
9	Mutua Madrid Open	$117,719	$692,260
10	Internazionali BNL d'Italia	$119,778	$812,038
11	French Open	$94,902	$906,940
12	Aegon Classic	$120,000	$1,026,940
13	Wimbledon	$110,667	$1,137,607
14	Bank of the West Classic	$20,000	$1,157,607
15	Rogers Cup	$12,620	$1,170,227
16	Western & Southern Open	$227,000	$1,397,227
17	US Open	$59,472	$1,456,699
18	Toray Pan Pacific Open	$196,670	$1,653,369
19	Wuhan Open	$6,630	$1,659,999
20	China Open	$228,340	$1,888,339
21	Generali Ladies Linz	$3,310	$1,819,649
22	WTA Finals	$426,000	$2,317,649
			$2,317,649

Figures in United States dollars (USD) unless noted.

=== Wins over Top 10s ===
#	Player	Rank	Event	Surface	Round	Score	AI rank
37.	(United States) Serena Williams	No. 1	Australian Open, Melbourne, AUS	Hard	4R	4–6, 6–3, 6–3	14
38.	(Germany) Angelique Kerber	No. 8	Dubai, UAE	Hard	1R	3–6, 6–3, 7–6^{(8–6)}	12
39.	(Romania) Simona Halep	No. 5	Fed Cup, Bucharest, Romania	Clay	RR	6–3, 7–6^{(7–2)}	12
40.	(Serbia) Jelena Janković	No. 8	Stuttgart, Germany	Clay (i)	SF	6–3, 7–5	12
41.	(Russia) Maria Sharapova	No. 7	Rome, Italy	Clay	3R	6–1, 6–4	13
42.	(Russia) Maria Sharapova	No. 6	Cincinnati, United States	Hard	SF	6–2, 5–7, 7–5	11
43.	(Germany) Angelique Kerber	No. 8	Tokyo, Japan	Hard	SF	7–5, 6–3	10
44.	(Denmark) Caroline Wozniacki	No. 9	Tokyo, Japan	Hard	F	6–2, 7–6^{(7–2)}	10
45.	(Canada) Eugenie Bouchard	No. 5	WTA Finals, Singapore	Hard (i)	RR	6–1, 6–3	7
46.	(Romania) Simona Halep	No. 4	WTA Finals, Singapore	Hard (i)	RR	7–6^{(9–7)}, 3–6, 6–3	7
