= 2014 Sony Open Tennis – Men's doubles =

Men's doubles
- 2014 Sony Open Tennis

Final
- Champions: (United States) Bob Bryan (United States) Mike Bryan
- Runners-up: (Colombia) Juan Sebastián Cabal (Colombia) Robert Farah
- Score: 7–6^{(10–8)}, 6–4

Events
Singles	men	women
Doubles	men	women
← 2013 ·	Miami Masters	· 2015 →

Aisam-ul-Haq Qureshi and Jean-Julien Rojer were the defending champions, but chose not to participate together. Qureshi played alongside Rohan Bopanna, but lost in the second round to Juan Sebastián Cabal and Robert Farah. Rojer teamed up with Horia Tecău, but lost in the first round to Julien Benneteau and Édouard Roger-Vasselin.
Bob and Mike Bryan won the title, defeating Juan Sebastián Cabal and Robert Farah in the final, 7–6^{(10–8)}, 6–4.

== Seeds ==
1. (United States) Bob Bryan / (United States) Mike Bryan (champions)
2. (Austria) Alexander Peya / (Brazil) Bruno Soares (quarterfinals)
3. (Croatia) Ivan Dodig / (Brazil) Marcelo Melo (second round)
4. (India) Leander Paes / (Czech Republic) Radek Štěpánek (first round)
5. (Spain) David Marrero / (Spain) Fernando Verdasco (quarterfinals)
6. (Canada) Daniel Nestor / (Serbia) Nenad Zimonjić (quarterfinals)
7. (India) Rohan Bopanna / (Pakistan) Aisam-ul-Haq Qureshi (second round)
8. (France) Michaël Llodra / (France) Nicolas Mahut (semifinals)

== Draw ==
=== Key ===
- Q = Qualifier
- WC = Wild card
- LL = Lucky loser
- Alt = Alternate
- SE = Special exempt
- PR = Protected ranking
- ITF = ITF entry
- JE = Junior exempt
- w/o = Walkover
- r = Retired
- d = Defaulted
- SR = Special ranking

=== Finals ===
Semifinals
1	(United States) Bob Bryan (United States) Mike Bryan	7^{7}	6
8	(France) Michaël Llodra (France) Nicolas Mahut	6^{2}	2
WC	(United States) Ryan Harrison (United States) Jack Sock	6	4	[9]
(Colombia) Juan Sebastián Cabal (Colombia) Robert Farah	2	6	[11]

Final
1	(United States) Bob Bryan (United States) Mike Bryan	7^{10}	6
(Colombia) Juan Sebastián Cabal (Colombia) Robert Farah	6^{8}	4

=== Top half ===
First round
1	(United States) B Bryan (United States) M Bryan	6	6
PR	(United Kingdom) C Fleming (United Kingdom) R Hutchins	4	4
(Mexico) S González (United States) S Lipsky	6^{5}	6	[9]
(Austria) O Marach (Russia) D Tursunov	7^{7}	3	[11]
(Poland) Ł Kubot (Sweden) R Lindstedt	6	6
(Argentina) F Delbonis (Argentina) J Mónaco	2	1
(Germany) A Begemann (Germany) F Mayer	6^{4}	4
5	(Spain) D Marrero (Spain) F Verdasco	7^{7}	6
3	(Croatia) I Dodig (Brazil) M Melo	1	6	[10]
(Austria) J Knowle (Canada) V Pospisil	6	1	[5]
(Spain) F López (Belarus) M Mirnyi	7	7^{7}
(Philippines) T Huey (United Kingdom) D Inglot	5	6^{2}
(Czech Republic) L Rosol (Argentina) H Zeballos	6	6^{5}	[10]
(Spain) N Almagro (Spain) G García López	3	7^{7}	[6]
(Poland) M Fyrstenberg (Poland) M Matkowski	5	6	[8]
8	(France) M Llodra (France) N Mahut	7	4	[10]

Second round
1	(United States) B Bryan (United States) M Bryan	6	6
(Austria) O Marach (Russia) D Tursunov	2	2
(Poland) Ł Kubot (Sweden) R Lindstedt	6^{2}	6^{8}
5	(Spain) D Marrero (Spain) F Verdasco	7^{7}	7^{10}
3	(Croatia) I Dodig (Brazil) M Melo	5	5
(Spain) F López (Belarus) M Mirnyi	7	7
(Czech Republic) L Rosol (Argentina) H Zeballos	3	0
8	(France) M Llodra (France) N Mahut	6	6

Quarterfinals
1	(United States) B Bryan (United States) M Bryan	6	7^{7}
5	(Spain) D Marrero (Spain) F Verdasco	3	6^{5}
(Spain) F López (Belarus) M Mirnyi	6^{6}	0
8	(France) M Llodra (France) N Mahut	7^{8}	6

Semifinals
1	(United States) B Bryan (United States) M Bryan	7^{7}	6
8	(France) M Llodra (France) N Mahut	6^{2}	2

=== Bottom half ===
First round
6	(Canada) D Nestor (Serbia) N Zimonjić	6	7
(United Kingdom) J Murray (Australia) J Peers	4	5
(Netherlands) R Haase (United Kingdom) J Marray	6	7^{7}
(Croatia) M Čilić (Czech Republic) L Dlouhý	4	6^{4}
WC	(United States) R Harrison (United States) J Sock	7	6
WC	(United States) D Baughman (United States) M Redlicki	5	4
(United States) E Butorac (South Africa) R Klaasen	6	7^{9}
4	(India) L Paes (Czech Republic) R Štěpánek	3	6^{7}
7	(India) R Bopanna (Pakistan) A-u-H Qureshi	6	6
PR	(Italy) S Bolelli (Italy) F Fognini	3	2
(Spain) M Granollers (Spain) M López	6	4	[10]
(Colombia) JS Cabal (Colombia) R Farah	1	6	[12]
(Netherlands) J-J Rojer (Romania) H Tecău	6	3	[11]
(France) J Benneteau (France) É Roger-Vasselin	3	6	[13]
(South Africa) K Anderson (India) M Bhupathi	4	6	[6]
2	(Austria) A Peya (Brazil) B Soares	6	4	[10]

Second round
6	(Canada) D Nestor (Serbia) N Zimonjić	6	6
(Netherlands) R Haase (United Kingdom) J Marray	2	4
WC	(United States) R Harrison (United States) J Sock	4	7^{7}	[10]
(United States) E Butorac (South Africa) R Klaasen	6	6^{4}	[6]
7	(India) R Bopanna (Pakistan) A-u-H Qureshi	2	4
(Colombia) JS Cabal (Colombia) R Farah	6	6
(France) J Benneteau (France) É Roger-Vasselin	6^{3}	7^{10}	[5]
2	(Austria) A Peya (Brazil) B Soares	7^{7}	6^{8}	[10]

Quarterfinals
6	(Canada) D Nestor (Serbia) N Zimonjić	4	6^{4}
WC	(United States) R Harrison (United States) J Sock	6	7^{7}
(Colombia) JS Cabal (Colombia) R Farah	6	7^{7}
2	(Austria) A Peya (Brazil) B Soares	2	6^{4}

Semifinals
WC	(United States) R Harrison (United States) J Sock	6	4	[9]
(Colombia) JS Cabal (Colombia) R Farah	2	6	[11]
