= 2014 Sony Open Tennis – Women's doubles =

Women's doubles
- 2014 Sony Open Tennis

Final
- Champions: (Switzerland) Martina Hingis (Germany) Sabine Lisicki
- Runners-up: (Russia) Ekaterina Makarova (Russia) Elena Vesnina
- Score: 4–6, 6–4, [10–5]

Events
Singles	men	women
Doubles	men	women
← 2013 ·	Miami Masters	· 2015 →

Martina Hingis and Sabine Lisicki defeated Ekaterina Makarova and Elena Vesnina in the final, 4–6, 6–4, [10–5] to win the women's doubles tennis title at the 2014 Miami Open. It was their first title together, and they saved 7 match points en route, in the quarterfinals. With the victory, Lisicki claimed her third doubles title overall, while it was the 38th for Hingis, and the first since her second professional comeback in the summer of 2013. The pair entered the tournament via a wildcard.

Nadia Petrova and Katarina Srebotnik were the defending champions, but did not participate together. Petrova partnered Bethanie Mattek-Sands, but the team withdrew before the first round due to Mattek-Sands's hip injury. Srebotnik partnered Květa Peschke, but lost in the quarterfinals to Cara Black and Sania Mirza.

== Seeds ==
1. (Chinese Taipei) Hsieh Su-wei / (China) Peng Shuai (first round)
2. (Russia) Ekaterina Makarova / (Russia) Elena Vesnina (final)
3. (Italy) Sara Errani / (Italy) Roberta Vinci (first round)
4. (Czech Republic) Květa Peschke / (Slovenia) Katarina Srebotnik (quarterfinals)
5. (Zimbabwe) Cara Black / (India) Sania Mirza (semifinals)
6. (Czech Republic) Andrea Hlaváčková / (Czech Republic) Lucie Šafářová (first round)
7. (Australia) Ashleigh Barty / (Australia) Casey Dellacqua (first round)
8. (United States) Raquel Kops-Jones / (United States) Abigail Spears (semifinals)

== Draw ==
=== Key ===
- Q = Qualifier
- WC = Wild card
- LL = Lucky loser
- Alt = Alternate
- SE = Special exempt
- PR = Protected ranking
- ITF = ITF entry
- JE = Junior exempt
- w/o = Walkover
- r = Retired
- d = Defaulted
- SR = Special ranking

=== Finals ===
Semifinals
WC	(Switzerland) Martina Hingis (Germany) Sabine Lisicki	6	6
5	(Zimbabwe) Cara Black (India) Sania Mirza	3	4
8	(United States) Raquel Kops-Jones (United States) Abigail Spears	5	5
2	(Russia) Ekaterina Makarova (Russia) Elena Vesnina	7	7

Final
WC	(Switzerland) Martina Hingis (Germany) Sabine Lisicki	4	6	[10]
2	(Russia) Ekaterina Makarova (Russia) Elena Vesnina	6	4	[5]

=== Top half ===
First round
1	(Chinese Taipei) S-w Hsieh (China) S Peng	2	6^{7}
(Japan) K Date-Krumm (Czech Republic) B Záhlavová-Strýcová	6	7^{9}
(Spain) A Medina Garrigues (Kazakhstan) Y Shvedova	6	6
(Hungary) T Babos (Serbia) J Janković	2	2
WC	(Romania) S Cîrstea (Russia) A Pavlyuchenkova	6	2	[10]
(Poland) A Rosolska (Spain) S Soler Espinosa	3	6	[5]
WC	(Switzerland) M Hingis (Germany) S Lisicki	6	6
6	(Czech Republic) A Hlaváčková (Czech Republic) L Šafářová	1	4
4	(Czech Republic) K Peschke (Slovenia) K Srebotnik	6	3	[10]
(Russia) S Kuznetsova (Australia) S Stosur	2	6	[4]
(Croatia) D Jurak (Croatia) M Lučić-Baroni	6	6
(Slovakia) D Hantuchová (Spain) A Parra Santonja	4	4
(Georgia (country)) O Kalashnikova (Russia) A Kleybanova	6	1	[11]
(Chinese Taipei) C-j Chuang (South Africa) C Scheepers	3	6	[9]
(Chinese Taipei) H-c Chan (Chinese Taipei) Y-j Chan	3	7^{8}	[8]
5	(Zimbabwe) C Black (India) S Mirza	6	6^{6}	[10]

Second round
(Japan) K Date-Krumm (Czech Republic) B Záhlavová-Strýcová	2	1
(Spain) A Medina Garrigues (Kazakhstan) Y Shvedova	6	6
WC	(Romania) S Cîrstea (Russia) A Pavlyuchenkova	2	1
WC	(Switzerland) M Hingis (Germany) S Lisicki	6	6
4	(Czech Republic) K Peschke (Slovenia) K Srebotnik	6	7
(Croatia) D Jurak (Croatia) M Lučić-Baroni	3	5
(Georgia (country)) O Kalashnikova (Russia) A Kleybanova
5	(Zimbabwe) C Black (India) S Mirza	w/o

Quarterfinals
(Spain) A Medina Garrigues (Kazakhstan) Y Shvedova	6	6^{7}	[7]
WC	(Switzerland) M Hingis (Germany) S Lisicki	3	7^{9}	[10]
4	(Czech Republic) K Peschke (Slovenia) K Srebotnik	4	3
5	(Zimbabwe) C Black (India) S Mirza	6	6

Semifinals
WC	(Switzerland) M Hingis (Germany) S Lisicki	6	6
5	(Zimbabwe) C Black (India) S Mirza	3	4

=== Bottom half ===
First round
8	(United States) R Kops-Jones (United States) A Spears	6	3	[10]
(France) K Mladenovic (Italy) F Pennetta	1	6	[7]
(United States) L Huber (United States) L Raymond	6^{3}	6^{3}
(United States) V King (China) J Zheng	7^{7}	7^{7}
WC	(Belgium) K Flipkens (Serbia) A Ivanovic	5	4
(Slovakia) J Husárová (Czech Republic) I Melzer	7	6
WC	(Spain) G Muguruza (Spain) C Suárez Navarro	7^{9}	1	[12]
3	(Italy) S Errani (Italy) R Vinci	6^{7}	6	[10]
7	(Australia) A Barty (Australia) C Dellacqua	6^{2}	6	[8]
(Russia) A Kudryavtseva (Australia) A Rodionova	7^{7}	3	[10]
(Romania) M Niculescu (Czech Republic) K Zakopalová	6	7
Alt	(Canada) S Fichman (United States) M Moulton-Levy	0	5
(Czech Republic) L Hradecká (Netherlands) M Krajicek	6	3	[9]
(Germany) J Görges (Germany) A-L Grönefeld	2	6	[11]
(New Zealand) M Erakovic (Croatia) P Martić	6	4	[7]
2	(Russia) E Makarova (Russia) E Vesnina	4	6	[10]

Second round
8	(United States) R Kops-Jones (United States) A Spears	3	7	[10]
(United States) V King (China) J Zheng	6	5	[6]
(Slovakia) J Husárová (Czech Republic) I Melzer	2	0
WC	(Spain) G Muguruza (Spain) C Suárez Navarro	6	6
(Russia) A Kudryavtseva (Australia) A Rodionova	6	7
(Romania) M Niculescu (Czech Republic) K Zakopalová	3	5
(Germany) J Görges (Germany) A-L Grönefeld	3	6^{4}
2	(Russia) E Makarova (Russia) E Vesnina	6	7^{7}

Quarterfinals
8	(United States) R Kops-Jones (United States) A Spears	1	6	[10]
WC	(Spain) G Muguruza (Spain) C Suárez Navarro	6	4	[5]
(Russia) A Kudryavtseva (Australia) A Rodionova	6	2	[8]
2	(Russia) E Makarova (Russia) E Vesnina	3	6	[10]

Semifinals
8	(United States) R Kops-Jones (United States) A Spears	5	5
2	(Russia) E Makarova (Russia) E Vesnina	7	7
