= 2014 Sony Open Tennis – Women's singles =

Women's singles
- 2014 Sony Open Tennis

Final
- Champion: (United States) Serena Williams
- Runner-up: (China) Li Na
- Score: 7–5, 6–1

Details
- Draw: 96
- Seeds: 32

Events
Singles	men	women
Doubles	men	women
- Miami Masters

Defending champion Serena Williams defeated Li Na in the final, 7–5, 6–1 to win the women's singles tennis title at the 2014 Miami Open. It was Williams' record-extending seventh Miami Open title, and was Li's last tournament final before her retirement later in 2014.

== Seeds ==
All seeds receive a bye into the second round.

1. (United States) Serena Williams (champion)
2. (China) Li Na (final)
3. (Poland) Agnieszka Radwańska (quarterfinals)
4. (Russia) Maria Sharapova (semifinals)
5. (Germany) Angelique Kerber (quarterfinals)
6. (Romania) Simona Halep (withdrew because of a right toe injury)
7. (Serbia) Jelena Janković (second round)
8. (Czech Republic) Petra Kvitová (quarterfinals)
9. (Italy) Sara Errani (third round)
10. (Slovakia) Dominika Cibulková (semifinals)
11. (Denmark) Caroline Wozniacki (quarterfinals)
12. (Serbia) Ana Ivanovic (fourth round)
13. (Italy) Roberta Vinci (second round)
14. (Germany) Sabine Lisicki (third round, withdrew with the flu)
15. (Spain) Carla Suárez Navarro (fourth round)
16. (Australia) Samantha Stosur (third round)

17. (United States) Sloane Stephens (third round)
18. (Canada) Eugenie Bouchard (second round)
19. (Belgium) Kirsten Flipkens (fourth round)
20. (Italy) Flavia Pennetta (third round)
21. (Russia) Anastasia Pavlyuchenkova (second round)
22. (France) Alizé Cornet (third round)
23. (Russia) Ekaterina Makarova (fourth round)
24. (Estonia) Kaia Kanepi (third round)
25. (Romania) Sorana Cîrstea (second round)
26. (Czech Republic) Lucie Šafářová (third round)
27. (Czech Republic) Klára Zakopalová (second round)
28. (Russia) Svetlana Kuznetsova (second round)
29. (United States) Venus Williams (fourth round)
30. (Spain) Garbiñe Muguruza (second round)
31. (Slovakia) Daniela Hantuchová (second round)
32. (Russia) Elena Vesnina (third round)

Click on the seed number of a player to go to their draw section.

== Draw ==
Key

- Q = Qualifier
- WC = Wild card
- LL = Lucky loser
- Alt = Alternate
- ITF = ITF entry
- PR = Protected ranking
- SR = Special ranking
- SE = Special exempt
- JE = Junior exempt
- JR = Junior Accelerator Programme entrant
- CO = College Accelerator Programme entrant
- NG = Next Gen Accelerator Program entrant
- w/o = Walkover
- r = Retired
- d = Defaulted

=== Finals ===
Quarterfinals
1	(United States) Serena Williams	6	6
5	(Germany) Angelique Kerber	2	2
4	(Russia) Maria Sharapova	7	6
8	(Czech Republic) Petra Kvitová	5	1
10	(Slovakia) Dominika Cibulková	3	7^{7}	6
3	(Poland) Agnieszka Radwańska	6	6^{5}	3
11	(Denmark) Caroline Wozniacki	5	5
2	(China) Li Na	7	7

Semifinals
1	(United States) Serena Williams	6	6
4	(Russia) Maria Sharapova	4	3
10	(Slovakia) Dominika Cibulková	5	6	3
2	(China) Li Na	7	2	6

Final
1	(United States) Serena Williams	7	6
2	(China) Li Na	5	1

=== Top half ===
==== Section 1 ====
First round
(Kazakhstan) Y Shvedova	6	6
(Italy) F Schiavone	4	2
(France) C Garcia	6	7
WC	(Canada) A Wozniak	3	5
Q	(United States) C Vandeweghe	6	7^{8}
(New Zealand) M Erakovic	4	6^{6}
Q	(Netherlands) K Bertens	7^{7}	6
WC	(United States) V Duval	6^{5}	1

Second round
1	(United States) S Williams	7^{9}	6
(Kazakhstan) Y Shvedova	6^{7}	2
(France) C Garcia	7^{7}	7^{7}
27	(Czech Republic) K Zakopalová	6^{3}	6^{3}
21	(Russia) A Pavlyuchenkova	6^{7}	5
Q	(United States) C Vandeweghe	7^{9}	7
Q	(Netherlands) K Bertens	3	2
16	(Australia) S Stosur	6	6

Third round
1	(United States) S Williams	6	4	6
(France) C Garcia	4	6	4
Q	(United States) C Vandeweghe	5	7	7
16	(Australia) S Stosur	7	5	5

Fourth round
1	(United States) S Williams	6	6
Q	(United States) C Vandeweghe	3	1

==== Section 2 ====
First round
(Italy) K Knapp	6	1	4
Q	(Austria) P Mayr-Achleitner	3	6	6
(Germany) M Barthel	4	2^{r}
WC	(Sweden) R Peterson	6	4
(Kazakhstan) G Voskoboeva	2	5
(Bulgaria) T Pironkova	6	7
(China) S Peng	7	6
(Czech Republic) Ka Plíšková	5	0

Second round
9	(Italy) S Errani	6	6
Q	(Austria) P Mayr-Achleitner	1	4
WC	(Sweden) R Peterson	1	1
23	(Russia) E Makarova	6	6
25	(Romania) S Cîrstea	3	3
(Bulgaria) T Pironkova	6	6
(China) S Peng	3	6	6^{5}
5	(Germany) A Kerber	6	1	7^{7}

Third round
9	(Italy) S Errani	3	6	4
23	(Russia) E Makarova	6	2	6
(Bulgaria) T Pironkova	0	2
5	(Germany) A Kerber	6	6

Fourth round
23	(Russia) E Makarova	4	6	3
5	(Germany) A Kerber	6	1	6

==== Section 3 ====
First round
(Germany) A Beck	6^{2}	4
(Japan) K Nara	7^{7}	6
Q	(Spain) E Cabeza Candela	0	0
(United States) V King	6	6
WC	(United Kingdom) H Watson	4	0
Q	(France) V Razzano	6	6
WC	(Russia) N Petrova	7	1	6
(Poland) U Radwańska	5	6	4

Second round
4	(Russia) M Sharapova	6	6
(Japan) K Nara	3	4
(United States) V King	3	6^{2}
26	(Czech Republic) L Šafářová	6	7^{7}
19	(Belgium) K Flipkens	6	3	6
Q	(France) V Razzano	1	6	3
WC	(Russia) N Petrova	6	4	4
14	(Germany) S Lisicki	3	6	6

Third round
4	(Russia) M Sharapova	6	6^{7}	6
26	(Czech Republic) L Šafářová	4	7^{9}	2
19	(Belgium) K Flipkens	w/o
14	(Germany) S Lisicki

Fourth round
4	(Russia) M Sharapova	3	6	6
19	(Belgium) K Flipkens	6	4	1

==== Section 4 ====
First round
(China) S Zhang	2	3
(United States) L Davis	6	6
Q	(Israel) S Pe'er	6	0	3
Q	(Belarus) O Govortsova	2	6	6
Q	(Japan) K Date-Krumm	6^{2}	2
Q	(Croatia) D Vekić	7^{7}	6
(Argentina) P Ormaechea	7^{7}	6
Q	(Poland) K Piter	6^{0}	1

Second round
12	(Serbia) A Ivanovic	6	6
(United States) L Davis	1	1
Q	(Belarus) O Govortsova	3	3
20	(Italy) F Pennetta	6	6
28	(Russia) S Kuznetsova	6^{5}	5
Q	(Croatia) D Vekić	7^{7}	7
(Argentina) P Ormaechea	3	4
8	(Czech Republic) P Kvitová	6	6

Third round
12	(Serbia) A Ivanovic	6	6
20	(Italy) F Pennetta	4	3
Q	(Croatia) D Vekić	3	4
8	(Czech Republic) P Kvitová	6	6

Fourth round
12	(Serbia) A Ivanovic	6	0	0
8	(Czech Republic) P Kvitová	3	6	6

=== Bottom half ===
==== Section 5 ====
First round
WC	(Australia) C Dellacqua	6	6
(Switzerland) S Vögele	3	2
WC	(Netherlands) I de Vroome	5	7	2
(Slovakia) A Schmiedlová	7	5	6
(Spain) MT Torró Flor	3	4
(Germany) A Petkovic	6	6
(Austria) Y Meusburger	6	6
(Spain) L Domínguez Lino	3	0

Second round
LL	(Slovakia) J Čepelová	4	6	4
WC	(Australia) C Dellacqua	6	1	6
(Slovakia) A Schmiedlová	3	3
29	(United States) V Williams	6	6
22	(France) A Cornet	6	6^{0}	6
(Germany) A Petkovic	2	7^{7}	4
(Austria) Y Meusburger	1	2
10	(Slovakia) D Cibulková	6	6

Third round
WC	(Australia) C Dellacqua	4	7	4
29	(United States) V Williams	6	5	6
22	(France) A Cornet	6^{6}	4
10	(Slovakia) D Cibulková	7^{8}	6

Fourth round
29	(United States) V Williams	1	7	3
10	(Slovakia) D Cibulková	6	5	6

==== Section 6 ====
First round
(Romania) M Niculescu	3	4
(Czech Republic) B Záhlavová-Strýcová	6	6
(United States) B Mattek-Sands	3	6	3
(Ukraine) E Svitolina	6	3	6
(United States) A Riske	1	7	6
Q	(Ukraine) N Kichenok	6	5	2
(Serbia) B Jovanovski	2	4
PR	(Switzerland) R Oprandi	6	6

Second round
13	(Italy) R Vinci	4	6	5
(Czech Republic) B Záhlavová-Strýcová	6	2	7
(Ukraine) E Svitolina	1	6	6
18	(Canada) E Bouchard	6	1	2
32	(Russia) E Vesnina	6	6
(United States) A Riske	2	2
PR	(Switzerland) R Oprandi	0	4
3	(Poland) A Radwańska	6	6

Third round
(Czech Republic) B Záhlavová-Strýcová	6	4	1
(Ukraine) E Svitolina	4	6	6
32	(Russia) E Vesnina	5	3
3	(Poland) A Radwańska	7	6

Fourth round
(Ukraine) E Svitolina	6^{5}	7	2
3	(Poland) A Radwańska	7^{7}	5	6

==== Section 7 ====
First round
(Belgium) Y Wickmayer	5	1
(United States) V Lepchenko	7	6
(Croatia) A Tomljanović	7^{7}	6
(France) K Mladenovic	6^{4}	4
Q	(Kazakhstan) Z Diyas	6	3	6
(Romania) A Cadanțu	4	6	2
(Puerto Rico) M Puig	6	7^{8}
(Slovakia) M Rybáriková	1	6^{6}

Second round
7	(Serbia) J Janković	3	6	6^{2}
(United States) V Lepchenko	6	2	7^{7}
(Croatia) A Tomljanović	3	7^{8}	6
30	(Spain) G Muguruza	6	6^{6}	1
17	(United States) S Stephens	7	6
Q	(Kazakhstan) Z Diyas	5	3
(Puerto Rico) M Puig	1	6	3
11	(Denmark) C Wozniacki	6	1	6

Third round
(United States) V Lepchenko	6	6^{4}	7^{7}
(Croatia) A Tomljanović	4	7^{7}	6^{2}
17	(United States) S Stephens	1	0
11	(Denmark) C Wozniacki	6	6

Fourth round
(United States) V Lepchenko	0	1
11	(Denmark) C Wozniacki	6	6

==== Section 8 ====
First round
(Spain) S Soler Espinosa	3	0
(South Africa) C Scheepers	6	6
(United States) C McHale	6	6
(China) J Zheng	4	2
WC	(Estonia) A Kontaveit	3	2
(United States) M Keys	6	6
PR	(Czech Republic) I Melzer	6^{3}	1
PR	(Russia) A Kleybanova	7^{7}	6

Second round
15	(Spain) C Suárez Navarro	6	6
(South Africa) C Scheepers	4	1
(United States) C McHale	6^{5}	6^{0}
24	(Estonia) K Kanepi	7^{7}	7^{7}
31	(Slovakia) D Hantuchová	4	2
(United States) M Keys	6	6
PR	(Russia) A Kleybanova
2	(China) N Li	w/o

Third round
15	(Spain) C Suárez Navarro	6	6
24	(Estonia) K Kanepi	2	1
(United States) M Keys	6^{3}	3
2	(China) N Li	7^{7}	6

Fourth round
15	(Spain) C Suárez Navarro	0	2
2	(China) N Li	6	6

== Qualifying ==
=== Seeds ===
1. (Slovakia) Jana Čepelová (qualifying competition, lucky loser)
2. (Italy) Camila Giorgi (first round)
3. (Sweden) Johanna Larsson (qualifying competition)
4. (Israel) Shahar Pe'er (qualified)
5. (France) Virginie Razzano (qualified)
6. (Austria) Patricia Mayr-Achleitner (qualified)
7. (Croatia) Mirjana Lučić-Baroni (qualifying competition)
8. (Germany) Julia Görges (qualifying competition)
9. (Israel) Julia Glushko (first round)
10. (Czech Republic) Petra Cetkovská (qualifying competition)
11. (Japan) Kimiko Date-Krumm (qualified)
12. (Belgium) Alison Van Uytvanck (first round)
13. (Belarus) Olga Govortsova (qualified)
14. (Spain) Anabel Medina Garrigues (first round)
15. (Poland) Katarzyna Piter (qualified)
16. (Canada) Sharon Fichman (qualifying competition)
17. (Croatia) Petra Martić (first round)
18. (Brazil) Teliana Pereira (first round)
19. (Japan) Misaki Doi (first round)
20. (Spain) Estrella Cabeza Candela (qualified)
21. (Luxembourg) Mandy Minella (first round)
22. (Croatia) Donna Vekić (qualified)
23. (Ukraine) Nadiia Kichenok (qualified)
24. (Hungary) Tímea Babos (first round)

=== Qualifiers ===
1. (Netherlands) Kiki Bertens
2. (Kazakhstan) Zarina Diyas
3. (Croatia) Donna Vekić
4. (Israel) Shahar Pe'er
5. (France) Virginie Razzano
6. (Austria) Patricia Mayr-Achleitner
7. (Ukraine) Nadiia Kichenok
8. (Belarus) Olga Govortsova
9. (Poland) Katarzyna Piter
10. (Spain) Estrella Cabeza Candela
11. (Japan) Kimiko Date-Krumm
12. (United States) CoCo Vandeweghe

=== Lucky losers ===
1. (Slovakia) Jana Čepelová

=== Qualifying draw ===
Key

- Q = Qualifier
- WC = Wild card
- LL = Lucky loser
- Alt = Alternate
- ITF = ITF entry
- PR = Protected ranking
- SR = Special ranking
- SE = Special exempt
- JE = Junior exempt
- JR = Junior Accelerator Programme entrant
- CO = College Accelerator Programme entrant
- NG = Next Gen Accelerator Program entrant
- w/o = Walkover
- r = Retired
- d = Defaulted

==== First qualifier ====
First round
1	(Slovakia) Jana Čepelová	3	6	6
(Czech Republic) Andrea Hlaváčková	6	4	3
(Netherlands) Kiki Bertens	4	6	6
17	(Croatia) Petra Martić	6	3	4

Qualifying competition
1	(Slovakia) Jana Čepelová	4	4
(Netherlands) Kiki Bertens	6	6

==== Second qualifier ====
First round
2	(Italy) Camila Giorgi	6^{4}	6	1
(Kazakhstan) Zarina Diyas	7^{7}	3	6
WC	(Russia) Varvara Flink	6	4	6
19	(Japan) Misaki Doi	4	6	3

Qualifying competition
(Kazakhstan) Zarina Diyas	7	6
WC	(Russia) Varvara Flink	5	1

==== Third qualifier ====
First round
3	(Sweden) Johanna Larsson	6	6
WC	(Turkey) İpek Soylu	1	4
(Russia) Alla Kudryavtseva	3	5
22	(Croatia) Donna Vekić	6	7

Qualifying competition
3	(Sweden) Johanna Larsson	1	1
22	(Croatia) Donna Vekić	6	6

==== Fourth qualifier ====
First round
4	(Israel) Shahar Pe'er	6	6
(Slovenia) Tadeja Majerič	3	2
(Thailand) Luksika Kumkhum	6	6
24	(Hungary) Tímea Babos	2	4

Qualifying competition
4	(Israel) Shahar Pe'er	6	6
(Thailand) Luksika Kumkhum	2	1

==== Fifth qualifier ====
First round
5	(France) Virginie Razzano	6	6
WC	(Australia) Naiktha Bains	3	3
(Chinese Taipei) Hsieh Su-wei	6	6
18	(Brazil) Teliana Pereira	2	2

Qualifying competition
5	(France) Virginie Razzano	4	6	6
(Chinese Taipei) Hsieh Su-wei	6	3	4

==== Sixth qualifier ====
First round
6	(Austria) Patricia Mayr-Achleitner	6	7^{7}
(Poland) Magda Linette	1	6^{5}
(Italy) Nastassja Burnett	6	2	6
21	(Luxembourg) Mandy Minella	4	6	3

Qualifying competition
6	(Austria) Patricia Mayr-Achleitner	6	5	6
(Italy) Nastassja Burnett	1	7	2

==== Seventh qualifier ====
First round
7	(Croatia) Mirjana Lučić-Baroni	6	6
(United States) Melanie Oudin	1	3
WC	(Russia) Anastasia Pivovarova	0	1
23	(Ukraine) Nadiia Kichenok	6	6

Qualifying competition
7	(Croatia) Mirjana Lučić-Baroni	1	7	3
23	(Ukraine) Nadiia Kichenok	6	5	6

==== Eighth qualifier ====
First round
8	(Germany) Julia Görges	6	3	7^{8}
(Portugal) Michelle Larcher de Brito	2	6	6^{6}
(United States) Shelby Rogers	2	1
13	(Belarus) Olga Govortsova	6	6

Qualifying competition
8	(Germany) Julia Görges	6^{3}	2
13	(Belarus) Olga Govortsova	7^{7}	6

==== Ninth qualifier ====
First round
9	(Israel) Julia Glushko	1	5
WC	(Russia) Irina Khromacheva	6	7
PR	(Netherlands) Michaëlla Krajicek	5	6	4
15	(Poland) Katarzyna Piter	7	1	6

Qualifying competition
WC	(Russia) Irina Khromacheva	6	5	3^{r}
15	(Poland) Katarzyna Piter	2	7	4

==== Tenth qualifier ====
First round
10	(Czech Republic) Petra Cetkovská	6	6
(Colombia) Mariana Duque Mariño	2	3
PR	(Chinese Taipei) Chan Yung-jan	3	6^{7}
20	(Spain) Estrella Cabeza Candela	6	7^{9}

Qualifying competition
10	(Czech Republic) Petra Cetkovská	4	4
20	(Spain) Estrella Cabeza Candela	6	6

==== Eleventh qualifier ====
First round
11	(Japan) Kimiko Date-Krumm	6	2	7^{7}
(Georgia (country)) Anna Tatishvili	4	6	6^{4}
WC	(Canada) Françoise Abanda	3	6	6
14	(Spain) Anabel Medina Garrigues	6	1	2

Qualifying competition
11	(Japan) Kimiko Date-Krumm	7^{7}	4	6
WC	(Canada) Françoise Abanda	6^{4}	6	4

==== Twelfth qualifier ====
First round
12	(Belgium) Alison Van Uytvanck	6^{2}	6^{4}
(United States) CoCo Vandeweghe	7^{7}	7^{7}
(Ukraine) Maryna Zanevska	4	1
16	(Canada) Sharon Fichman	6	6

Qualifying competition
(United States) CoCo Vandeweghe	6	6
16	(Canada) Sharon Fichman	4	3
