= 2014 Sony Open Tennis =

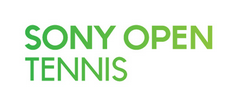
- Date: March 17–30
- Edition: 30th
- Category: Masters 1000 (ATP); Premier Mandatory (WTA)
- Draw: 96S / 48Q / 32D
- Prize money: $4,562,245 (men) $4,562,245 (women)
- Surface: Hard - outdoor
- Location: Key Biscayne, Florida, United States
- Venue: Tennis Center at Crandon Park

Champions

Men's singles
- (Serbia) Novak Djokovic

Women's singles
- (United States) Serena Williams

Men's doubles
- (United States) Bob Bryan / (United States) Mike Bryan

Women's doubles
- (Switzerland) Martina Hingis / (Germany) Sabine Lisicki
- Miami Masters

The 2014 Sony Open Tennis (also known as 2014 Miami Masters) was a professional men and women's tennis tournament played on outdoor hard courts. It was the 30th edition of the Miami Masters, and was part of the Masters 1000 category on the 2014 ATP World Tour, and of the Premier Mandatory category on the 2014 WTA Tour. All men and women's events took place at the Tennis Center at Crandon Park in Key Biscayne, Florida, United States, from March 17 through March 30, 2014.

== Finals ==
=== Men's singles ===
- (Serbia) Novak Djokovic defeated (Spain) Rafael Nadal, 6–3, 6–3

=== Women's singles ===
- (United States) Serena Williams defeated (China) Li Na, 7–5, 6–1

=== Men's doubles ===
- (United States) Bob Bryan / (United States) Mike Bryan defeated (Colombia) Juan Sebastián Cabal / (Colombia) Robert Farah, 7–6^{(10–8)}, 6–4

=== Women's doubles ===
- (Switzerland) Martina Hingis / (Germany) Sabine Lisicki defeated (Russia) Ekaterina Makarova / (Russia) Elena Vesnina, 4–6, 6–4, [10–5]

== Points and prize money ==
=== Point distribution ===
Event	W	F	SF	QF	Round of 16	Round of 32	Round of 64	Round of 128	Q	Q2	Q1
Men's singles	1000	600	360	180	90	45	25*	10	16	8	0
Men's doubles	1000	600	360	180	90	0	—N/a	—N/a	—N/a	—N/a	—N/a
Women's singles	1000	650	390	215	120	65	35*	10	30	20	2
Women's doubles	1000	650	390	215	120	10	—N/a	—N/a	—N/a	—N/a	—N/a

- Players with byes receive first round points.

=== Prize money ===
The total commitment prize money for this year's event was $5,649,405 for men and $5,427,105 for women (WTA Tour and ATP World Tour).

Event	W	F	SF	QF	Round of 16	Round of 32	Round of 64	Round of 128	Q2	Q1
Singles	$787,000	$384,065	$192,485	$98,130	$51,730	$27,685	$14,945	$9,165	$2,730	$1,395
Doubles	$257,860	$125,850	$63,070	$32,140	$16,950	$9,070	—N/a	—N/a	—N/a	—N/a

== Players ==
=== Men's singles ===
==== Seeds ====
The following are the seeded players. Rankings and seedings are according to ATP rankings on March 17, 2014.

Seed	Rank	Player	Points before	Points defending	Points won	Points after	Status
1	1	(Spain) Rafael Nadal	13,130	0	600	13,730	Final lost to (Serbia) Novak Djokovic [2]
2	2	(Serbia) Novak Djokovic	10,900	90	1,000	11,810	Champion, won against (Spain) Rafael Nadal [1]
3	3	(Switzerland) Stanislas Wawrinka	5,650	0	90	5,740	Fourth round lost to (Ukraine) Alexandr Dolgopolov [22]
4	4	(Spain) David Ferrer	5,150	600	90	4,640	Fourth round lost to (Japan) Kei Nishikori [20]
5	5	(Switzerland) Roger Federer	5,045	0	180	5,225	Quarterfinals lost to (Japan) Kei Nishikori [20]
6	6	(United Kingdom) Andy Murray	4,795	1,000	180	3,975	Quarterfinals lost to (Serbia) Novak Djokovic [2]
7	7	(Czech Republic) Tomáš Berdych	4,540	180	360	4,720	Withdrew prior to semifinal match
8	8	(Argentina) Juan Martín del Potro	4,270	10	0	4,260	Withdrew prior to second round match
9	9	(France) Richard Gasquet	2,905	360	90	2,635	Fourth round lost to (Switzerland) Roger Federer [5]
10	10	(United States) John Isner	2,670	45	90	2,715	Fourth round lost to (Czech Republic) Tomáš Berdych [7]
11	11	(France) Jo-Wilfried Tsonga	2,615	90	90	2,615	Fourth round lost to (United Kingdom) Andy Murray [6]
12	12	(Canada) Milos Raonic	2,575	45	180	2,710	Quarterfinals lost to (Spain) Rafael Nadal [1]
13	13	(Germany) Tommy Haas	2,435	360	0	2,075	Withdrew prior to second round match
14	14	(Italy) Fabio Fognini	2,295	45	90	2,340	Fourth round lost to (Spain) Rafael Nadal [1]
15	16	(Bulgaria) Grigor Dimitrov	2,130	45	45	2,130	Third round lost to (Japan) Kei Nishikori [20]
16	17	(Spain) Tommy Robredo	2,050	(0)	90	2,140	Fourth round lost to (Serbia) Novak Djokovic [2]
17	18	(South Africa) Kevin Anderson	1,940	45	45	1,940	Third round lost to (France) Richard Gasquet [9]
18	19	(Spain) Nicolás Almagro	1,795	90	45	1,750	Third round lost to (United States) John Isner [10]
19	20	(Poland) Jerzy Janowicz	1,715	10	10	1,715	Second round lost to (Spain) Roberto Bautista Agut
20	21	(Japan) Kei Nishikori	1,715	90	360	1,985	Withdrew prior to semifinal match
21	22	(Latvia) Ernests Gulbis	1,690	(45)	10	1,655	Second round lost to (France) Julien Benneteau
22	23	(Ukraine) Alexandr Dolgopolov	1,555	45	180	1,690	Quarterfinals lost to (Czech Republic) Tomáš Berdych [7]
23	24	(France) Gaël Monfils	1,520	(20)	10	1,510	Second round lost to (Spain) Guillermo García López
24	25	(Germany) Philipp Kohlschreiber	1,510	10	10	1,510	Second round lost to (Cyprus) Marcos Baghdatis [WC]
25	26	(Croatia) Marin Čilić	1,500	180	10	1,330	Second round lost to (France) Édouard Roger-Vasselin
26	27	(France) Gilles Simon	1,485	180	10	1,315	Second round lost to (Portugal) João Sousa
27	28	(Canada) Vasek Pospisil	1,343	(48)	10	1,305	Second round lost to (Slovenia) Aljaž Bedene [Q]
28	29	(Spain) Fernando Verdasco	1,270	10	10	1,270	Second round lost to (Netherlands) Thiemo de Bakker [Q]
29	30	(Russia) Dmitry Tursunov	1,231	41	10	1,200	Second round lost to (Uzbekistan) Denis Istomin
30	32	(Germany) Florian Mayer	1,210	10	45	1,245	Withdrew prior to third round match
31	33	(Italy) Andreas Seppi	1,195	90	45	1,150	Third round lost to (Spain) David Ferrer [4]
32	34	(Spain) Feliciano López	1,180	0	45	1,225	Third round lost to (United Kingdom) Andy Murray [6]

==== Withdrawn players ====
Rank	Player	Points Before	Points defending	Points won	Points after	Withdrew due to
15	(Russia) Mikhail Youzhny	2,135	45	0	2,090	Back injury
31	(France) Benoît Paire	1,230	10	0	1,220	Knee injury

==== Other entrants ====
The following players received wildcards into the singles main draw:

- (Cyprus) Marcos Baghdatis
- (United Kingdom) Kyle Edmund
- (United States) Ryan Harrison
- (Russia) Karen Khachanov
- (Argentina) Guido Pella

The following players received entry from the qualifying draw:

- (Slovenia) Aljaž Bedene
- (Russia) Alex Bogomolov Jr.
- (Netherlands) Thiemo de Bakker
- (Belgium) David Goffin
- (Kazakhstan) Andrey Golubev
- (Tunisia) Malek Jaziri
- (United States) Steve Johnson
- (Slovakia) Lukáš Lacko
- (France) Paul-Henri Mathieu
- (United States) Jack Sock
- (Austria) Dominic Thiem
- (Chinese Taipei) Jimmy Wang

The following players received entry as lucky losers:

- (Germany) Benjamin Becker
- (Serbia) Dušan Lajović

==== Withdrawals ====
Before the tournament

- (Spain) Pablo Andújar → replaced by (France) Stéphane Robert
- (United States) Brian Baker → replaced by (United States) Bradley Klahn
- (Argentina) Juan Martín del Potro (wrist injury) → replaced by (Germany) Benjamin Becker
- (Germany) Tommy Haas (shoulder injury) → replaced by (Serbia) Dušan Lajović
- (Austria) Jürgen Melzer (shoulder injury) → replaced by (Czech Republic) Jiří Veselý
- (France) Benoît Paire (knee injury) → replaced by (Ukraine) Sergiy Stakhovsky
- (Israel) Dudi Sela → replaced by (France) Kenny de Schepper
- (Serbia) Janko Tipsarević (foot injury) → replaced by (Croatia) Ivo Karlović
- (Russia) Mikhail Youzhny (back injury) → replaced by (Spain) Daniel Gimeno Traver

During the tournament

- (Czech Republic) Tomáš Berdych (gastroenteritis)
- (Germany) Florian Mayer
- (Japan) Kei Nishikori (groin injury)

==== Retirements ====
- (Kazakhstan) Mikhail Kukushkin

=== Men's doubles ===
==== Seeds ====
Country	Player	Country	Player	Rank^{1}	Seed
USA	Bob Bryan	USA	Mike Bryan	2	1
AUT	Alexander Peya	BRA	Bruno Soares	6	2
CRO	Ivan Dodig	BRA	Marcelo Melo	11	3
IND	Leander Paes	CZE	Radek Štěpánek	18	4
ESP	David Marrero	ESP	Fernando Verdasco	18	5
CAN	Daniel Nestor	SRB	Nenad Zimonjić	27	6
IND	Rohan Bopanna	PAK	Aisam-ul-Haq Qureshi	29	7
FRA	Michaël Llodra	FRA	Nicolas Mahut	38	8

- ^{1} Rankings as of March 17, 2014.

==== Other entrants ====
The following pairs received wildcards into the doubles main draw:

- (United States) Deiton Baughman / (United States) Martin Redlicki
- (United States) Ryan Harrison / (United States) Jack Sock

=== Women's singles ===
==== Seeds ====
The following are the seeded players. Rankings and seedings are according to WTA rankings on March 3, 2014. Points before is as of March 17, 2014.

Seed	Rank	Player	Points before	Points defending	Points won	Points after	Status
1	1	(United States) Serena Williams	12,660	1,000	1,000	12,660	Champion, won against (China) Li Na [2]
2	2	(China) Li Na	7,185	250	650	7,585	Final lost to (United States) Serena Williams [1]
3	3	(Poland) Agnieszka Radwańska	6,215	450	215	5,980	Quarterfinals lost to (Slovakia) Dominika Cibulková [10]
4	5	(Russia) Maria Sharapova	4,271	700	390	3,961	Semifinals lost to (United States) Serena Williams [1]
5	6	(Germany) Angelique Kerber	4,050	80	215	4,185	Quarterfinals lost to (United States) Serena Williams [1]
6	7	(Romania) Simona Halep	4,775	80	0	4,695	Withdrew prior to second round match
7	8	(Serbia) Jelena Janković	4,590	450	10	4,150	Second round lost to (United States) Varvara Lepchenko
8	9	(Czech Republic) Petra Kvitová	4,235	80	215	4,370	Quarterfinals lost to (Russia) Maria Sharapova [4]
9	10	(Italy) Sara Errani	3,830	250	65	3,645	Third round lost to (Russia) Ekaterina Makarova [23]
10	11	(Slovakia) Dominika Cibulková	3,470	140	390	3,720	Semifinals lost to (China) Li Na [2]
11	12	(Denmark) Caroline Wozniacki	2,605	80	215	2,740	Quarterfinals lost to (China) Li Na [2]
12	13	(Serbia) Ana Ivanovic	3,140	140	120	3,120	Fourth round lost to (Czech Republic) Petra Kvitová [8]
13	14	(Italy) Roberta Vinci	2,925	250	10	2,685	Second round lost to (Czech Republic) Barbora Záhlavová-Strýcová
14	15	(Germany) Sabine Lisicki	2,660	5	65	2,720	Third round, Withdrew against Kirsten Flipkens
15	16	(Spain) Carla Suárez Navarro	2,620	80	120	2,660	Fourth round lost to (China) Li Na [2]
16	17	(Australia) Samantha Stosur	2,420	0	65	2,485	Third round lost to (United States) CoCo Vandeweghe [Q]
17	18	(United States) Sloane Stephens	2,625	140	65	2,550	Third round lost to (Denmark) Caroline Wozniacki [11]
18	19	(Canada) Eugenie Bouchard	2,485	50	10	2,445	Second round lost to (Ukraine) Elina Svitolina
19	20	(Belgium) Kirsten Flipkens	2,215	250	120	2,085	Fourth round lost to (Russia) Maria Sharapova [4]
20	21	(Italy) Flavia Pennetta	3,255	50	65	3,270	Third round lost to (Serbia) Ana Ivanovic [12]
21	22	(Russia) Anastasia Pavlyuchenkova	2,240	5	10	2,245	Second round lost to (United States) CoCo Vandeweghe [Q]
22	23	(France) Alizé Cornet	2,230	140	65	2,155	Third round lost to (Slovakia) Dominika Cibulková [10]
23	24	(Russia) Ekaterina Makarova	2,125	5	120	2,240	Fourth round lost to (Germany) Angelique Kerber [5]
24	26	(Estonia) Kaia Kanepi	2,045	0	65	2,110	Third round lost to (Spain) Carla Suárez Navarro [15]
25	27	(Romania) Sorana Cîrstea	1,910	140	10	1,780	Second round lost to (Bulgaria) Tsvetana Pironkova
26	28	(Czech Republic) Lucie Šafářová	1,880	5	65	1,940	Third round lost to (Russia) Maria Sharapova [4]
27	29	(Czech Republic) Klára Zakopalová	1,615	140	10	1,485	Second round lost to (France) Caroline Garcia
28	30	(Russia) Svetlana Kuznetsova	1,583	80	10	1,513	Second round lost to (Croatia) Donna Vekić [Q]
29	31	(United States) Venus Williams	1,577	80	120	1,617	Fourth round lost to (Slovakia) Dominika Cibulková [10]
30	32	(Spain) Garbiñe Muguruza	1,403	140	10	1,273	Second round lost to (Croatia) Ajla Tomljanović
31	34	(Slovakia) Daniela Hantuchová	1,442	50	10	1,402	Second round lost to (United States) Madison Keys
32	35	(Russia) Elena Vesnina	1,395	80	65	1,380	Third round lost to (Poland) Agnieszka Radwańska [3]

==== Withdrawn players ====
Rank	Player	Points Before	Points defending	Points won	Points after	Withdrew due to
4	(Belarus) Victoria Azarenka	5,441	0	0	5,441	Foot injury
25	(Russia) Maria Kirilenko	1,596	80	0	1,516	Knee injury
33	(United States) Jamie Hampton	1,452	50	0	1,402	Hip Injury

==== Other entrants ====
The following players received wildcards into the singles main draw:

- (Australia) Casey Dellacqua
- (Netherlands) Indy de Vroome
- (United States) Victoria Duval
- (Estonia) Anett Kontaveit
- (Sweden) Rebecca Peterson
- (Russia) Nadia Petrova
- (United Kingdom) Heather Watson
- (Canada) Aleksandra Wozniak

The following players received entry using a protected ranking into the singles main draw:

- (Russia) Alisa Kleybanova
- (Czech Republic) Iveta Melzer
- (Switzerland) Romina Oprandi

The following players received entry from the qualifying draw:

- (Netherlands) Kiki Bertens
- (Spain) Estrella Cabeza Candela
- (Japan) Kimiko Date-Krumm
- (Kazakhstan) Zarina Diyas
- (Belarus) Olga Govortsova
- (Ukraine) Nadiia Kichenok
- (Austria) Patricia Mayr-Achleitner
- (Israel) Shahar Pe'er
- (Poland) Katarzyna Piter
- (France) Virginie Razzano
- (United States) CoCo Vandeweghe
- (Croatia) Donna Vekić

The following player received entry as a lucky loser:

- (Slovakia) Jana Čepelová

==== Withdrawals ====
Before the tournament

- (Belarus) Victoria Azarenka (foot injury) → replaced by (South Africa) Chanelle Scheepers
- (Romania) Simona Halep (toe injury) → replaced by (Slovakia) Jana Čepelová
- (United States) Jamie Hampton → replaced by (Belgium) Yanina Wickmayer
- (Slovenia) Polona Hercog → replaced by (France) Caroline Garcia
- (Russia) Maria Kirilenko → replaced by (Slovakia) Anna Karolína Schmiedlová
- (Japan) Ayumi Morita → replaced by (Spain) Sílvia Soler Espinosa
- (United Kingdom) Laura Robson (wrist injury) → replaced by (Kazakhstan) Yaroslava Shvedova

During the tournament

- (Russia) Alisa Kleybanova (illness)
- (Germany) Sabine Lisicki (flu)

==== Retirements ====
- (Germany) Mona Barthel (gastrointestinal illness)

=== Women's doubles ===
==== Seeds ====
Country	Player	Country	Player	Rank^{1}	Seed
TPE	Hsieh Su-wei	CHN	Peng Shuai	3	1
RUS	Ekaterina Makarova	RUS	Elena Vesnina	7	2
ITA	Sara Errani	ITA	Roberta Vinci	12	3
CZE	Květa Peschke	SLO	Katarina Srebotnik	14	4
ZIM	Cara Black	IND	Sania Mirza	24	5
CZE	Andrea Hlaváčková	CZE	Lucie Šafářová	25	6
AUS	Ashleigh Barty	AUS	Casey Dellacqua	34	7
USA	Raquel Kops-Jones	USA	Abigail Spears	38	8

- ^{1} Rankings as of March 3, 2014.

==== Other entrants ====
The following pairs received wildcards into the doubles main draw:

- (Romania) Sorana Cîrstea / (Russia) Anastasia Pavlyuchenkova
- (Belgium) Kirsten Flipkens / (Serbia) Ana Ivanovic
- (Switzerland) Martina Hingis / (Germany) Sabine Lisicki
- (Spain) Garbiñe Muguruza / (Spain) Carla Suárez Navarro

The following pair received entry as alternates:

- (Canada) Sharon Fichman / (United States) Megan Moulton-Levy

==== Withdrawals ====
Before the tournament

- (United States) Bethanie Mattek-Sands (left hip injury)

During the tournament

- (Russia) Alisa Kleybanova (illness)
