= The Energi Danmark Champions Battle (Tennis Exhibition) =

The Energi Denmark Champions Battle

Tournament information
- Founded: 2014
- Location: Herning, Denmark
- Venue: Jyske Bank Boxen (2014-present)
- Surface: hard indoor

The Energi Danmark Champions Battle is a one-night tennis exhibition held each November since 2014. The event is held at the Jyske Bank Boxen in Herning, Denmark. In first two editions matches were played in front of a sold-out crowd of 7,000.

The event format is a women's singles match and men's doubles match played with active players. In singles, they compete in a best-of-three set match with regular scoring, which means ad scoring is included. In doubles, rules are as of a regular doubles match, meaning when it's one-set all Super-Tie Break is played, and scoring is no-ad.

Caroline Wozniacki, the winner of second edition in 2015, received a Shamballa bracelet worth 100,000 Danish krones (just over $14,000).

== List of winners ==
Year	Champion	Runner-up	Score	Ref
2014	(Serbia) Ana Ivanovic	(United States) Serena Williams	6–4, 6–4	
2014	(Sweden) Robert Lindstedt & (Romania) Horia Tecau vs (Denmark) Frederik Nielsen & (United Kingdom) Jonathan Marray		?	
2015	(Denmark) Caroline Wozniacki	(United States) Serena Williams	6–3, 6–4	
2015	(Netherlands) Jean-Julien Rojer & (Romania) Horia Tecau	(Denmark) Frederik Nielsen & (United Kingdom) Jonathan Marray	6–4, 3–6, [10–5]	
2018	(Denmark) Caroline Wozniacki	(United States) Venus Williams	6–4, 6–3	
