= Marcos Baghdatis =

Cypriot tennis player (born 1985)

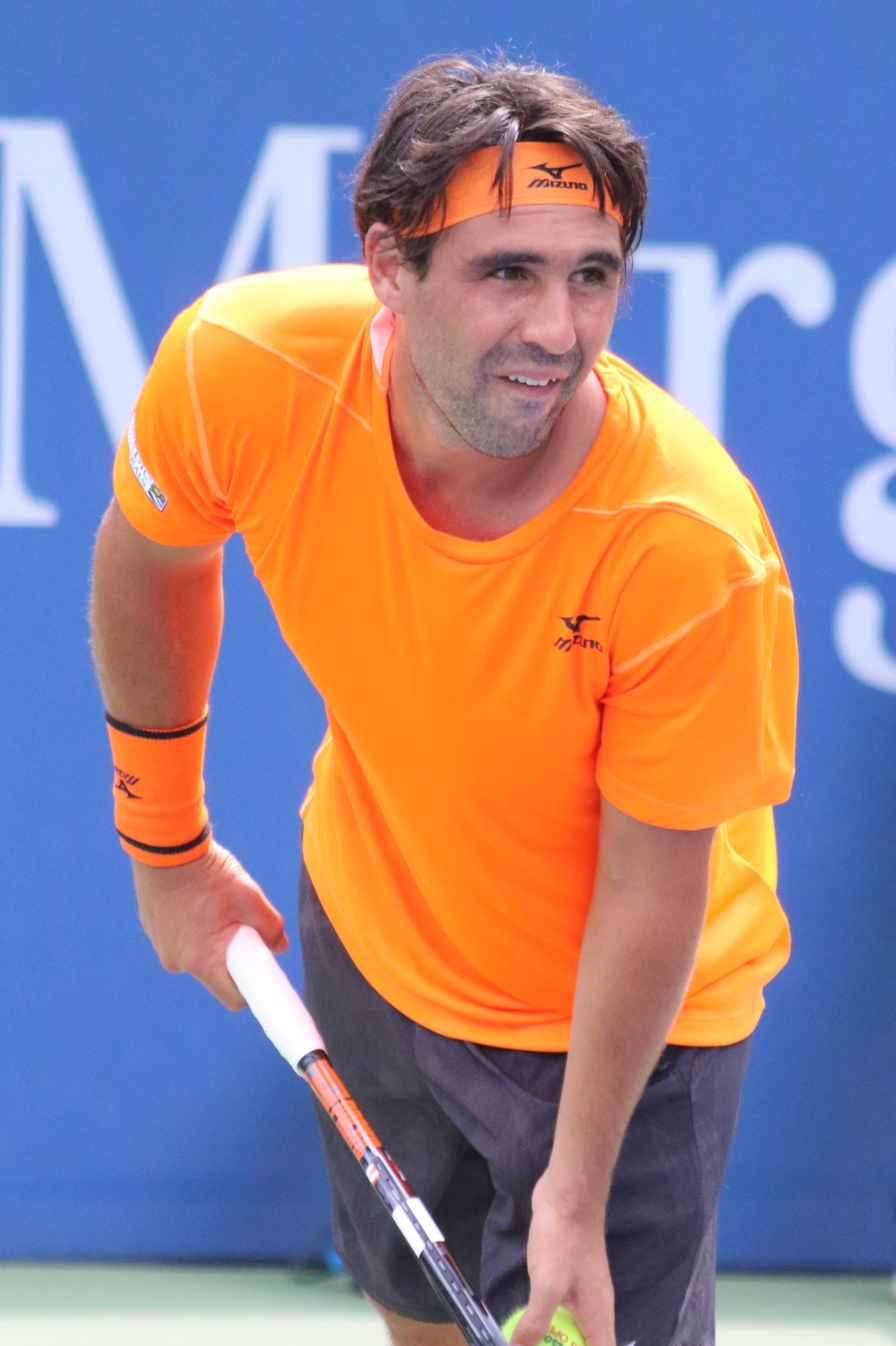
- Baghdatis at the 2016 US Open
- Country (sports): Cyprus
- Residence: Limassol, Cyprus
- Born: 17 June 1985 (age 41) Paramytha, Limassol District, Cyprus
- Height: 1.78 m (5 ft 10 in)
- Turned pro: 2003
- Retired: 2019
- Plays: Right-handed (two-handed backhand)
- Prize money: US$8,918,917

Singles
- Career record: 349–274 (56%)
- Career titles: 4
- Highest ranking: No. 8 (21 August 2006)

Grand Slam singles results
- Australian Open: F (2006)
- French Open: 4R (2007)
- Wimbledon: SF (2006)
- US Open: 4R (2016)

Other tournaments
- Olympic Games: 3R (2012)

Doubles
- Career record: 50–62 (44.6%)
- Career titles: 1
- Highest ranking: No. 93 (7 January 2008)

Grand Slam doubles results
- Australian Open: 3R (2013)
- French Open: 1R (2016)
- Wimbledon: 1R (2007, 2016, 2017)
- US Open: 2R (2016)

Marcos Baghdatis (Greek: Μάρκος Παγδατής; born 17 June 1985) is a Greek Cypriot former professional tennis player and coach. He was the runner-up at the 2006 Australian Open and a semifinalist at the 2006 Wimbledon Championships, and reached a career-high ATP singles ranking of world No. 8 in August 2006. In the latter part of his career, Baghdatis endured a series of injuries that impacted his play.

== Early life ==
Baghdatis was born in Paramytha, Cyprus, to a Lebanese father, Christos Baghdatis (Arabic: كريستوس باغداتيس), and a Greek Cypriot mother, Androula Baghdati (Greek: Ανδρούλα Παγδατή). He has two brothers—Petros and Marinos—and a sister, Zena, who was adopted by his family at just six months old. His father, a native Lebanese Greek Orthodox Christian, emigrated to Cyprus from Tripoli, Lebanon and owns a clothes shop.

Marcos began playing tennis at the age of five with his father and brothers. He grew up idolizing tennis players Pat Rafter, Andre Agassi and Pete Sampras. He enjoys playing and watching football and is a supporter of Manchester City in England. He trained at the Mouratoglou Tennis Academy in Paris on an Olympic Solidarity Youth Development Programme Scholarship from age 14 and learned to speak French.

Baghdatis received the 2005 Cyprus Male Athlete of the Year award. On 28 January 2006, he received an exemption from the otherwise mandatory Cypriot national service so that he could concentrate on tennis.

== Personal life ==
On 14 July 2012, Baghdatis married the Croatian former tennis player Karolina Šprem. They had their first child, a daughter Zahara, on 20 October 2012, a second daughter, India, on 17 December 2015, and a son, Zeus.

== Junior career ==
Baghdatis played his first junior match in September 1998 at the age of 14 at a Grade-5 tournament in Cyprus. He made the final at the 2002 Junior US Open but lost to Richard Gasquet. He reached No. 1 in the ITF Junior Circuit world singles rankings in January 2003. He then won the 2003 Junior Australian Open as the top seed defeating Florin Mergea in the final. He then repeated his final feat from 2002 at the 2003 Junior US Open but lost to Jo-Wilfried Tsonga, his major rival in his junior career. He then won the 2003 Orange Bowl for the U18 category defeating Gaël Monfils in the final. He ended his junior career after 2003 with a win–loss record of 152–41.

Junior Grand Slam results – Singles:
Australian Open: W (2003)
French Open: QF (2003)
Wimbledon: 2R (2001, 2002)
US Open: F (2002, 2003)

== Professional career ==
=== 2004: First full year as professional ===
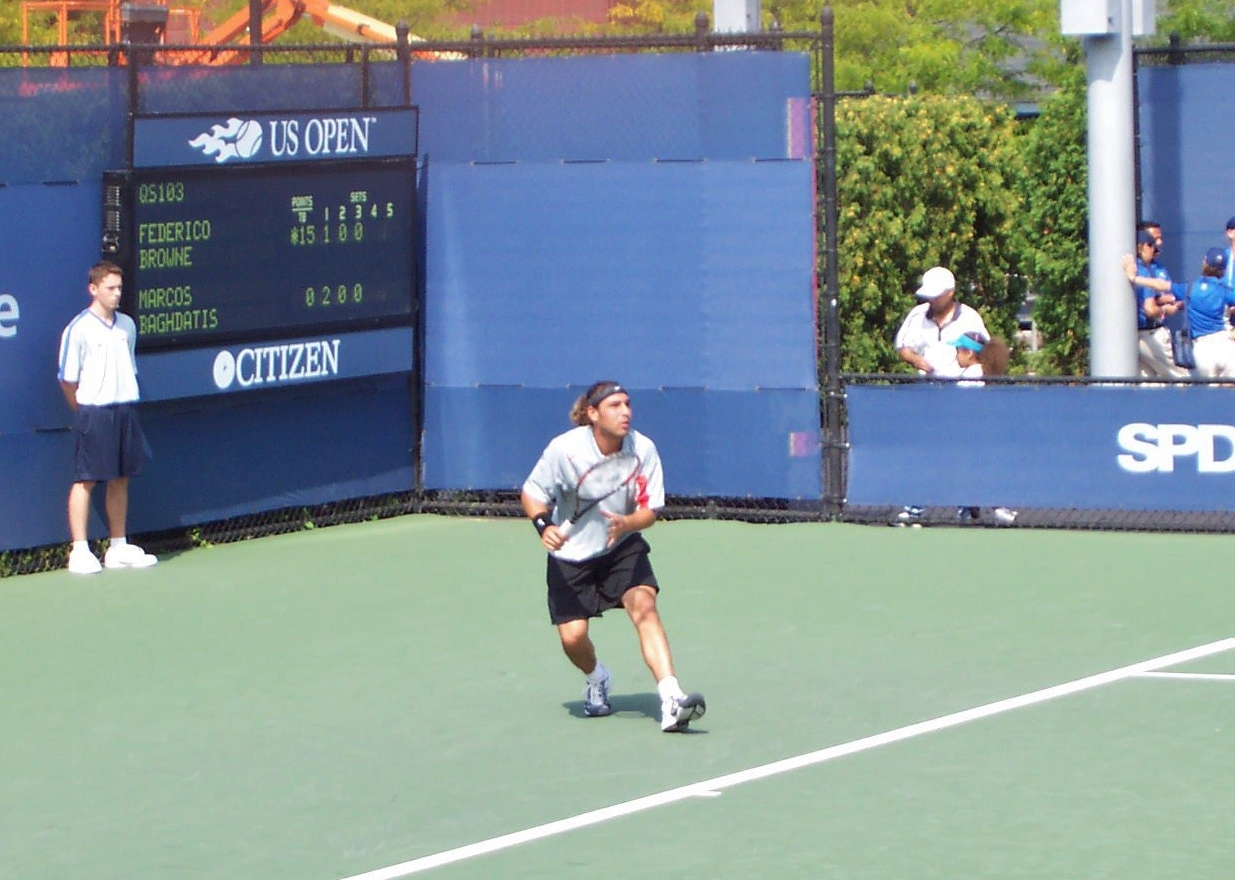
Baghdatis at the 2004 US Open

Baghdatis performed moderately throughout most of 2004. He picked up his form later in that year.

At the US Open, Baghdatis played for the first time in the main draw of a Grand Slam tournament. He defeated Olivier Mutis in a first-round match 2–6, 6–2, 6–1, 7–5. He was one of only two players who won a set from eventual champion, Roger Federer (the other being Andre Agassi). Baghdatis then finished the year with two Challenger tournament titles, in which he defeated many higher-ranked opponents.

=== 2005: A rising star ===
Baghdatis's 2005 season began with a first-round loss in the Chennai Open against Nicolas Devilder. In his next tournament, the Australian Open, as a qualifier, Baghdatis defeated then-top-20 player Ivan Ljubičić in the second round and had a straight sets victory over another top-20 player, Tommy Robredo, in the third round, before losing to Roger Federer in the fourth round. Baghdatis suffered an elbow injury right after the Australian Open and was out of the professional tour until late April, when he entered a clay court tournament, the Estoril Open in Portugal. He held two match points in his first-round match against a resurging Juan Carlos Ferrero, but failed to convert them into a win.

Baghdatis kept playing Challengers and qualifying for upper-tier ATP events for the rest of 2005 and found good form towards the end of the year. As a qualifier, he reached the final of the ATP tournament at Basel, defeating former world No. 2, Tommy Haas, world No. 40, José Acasuso, and the eventual 2005 Masters Cup champion David Nalbandian. But he lost the final to Fernando González in four sets. Although he was not the first qualifier to reach an ATP Tour event final, he was the first player from Cyprus to do so.

=== 2006: Australian Open final and entering top 10 ===
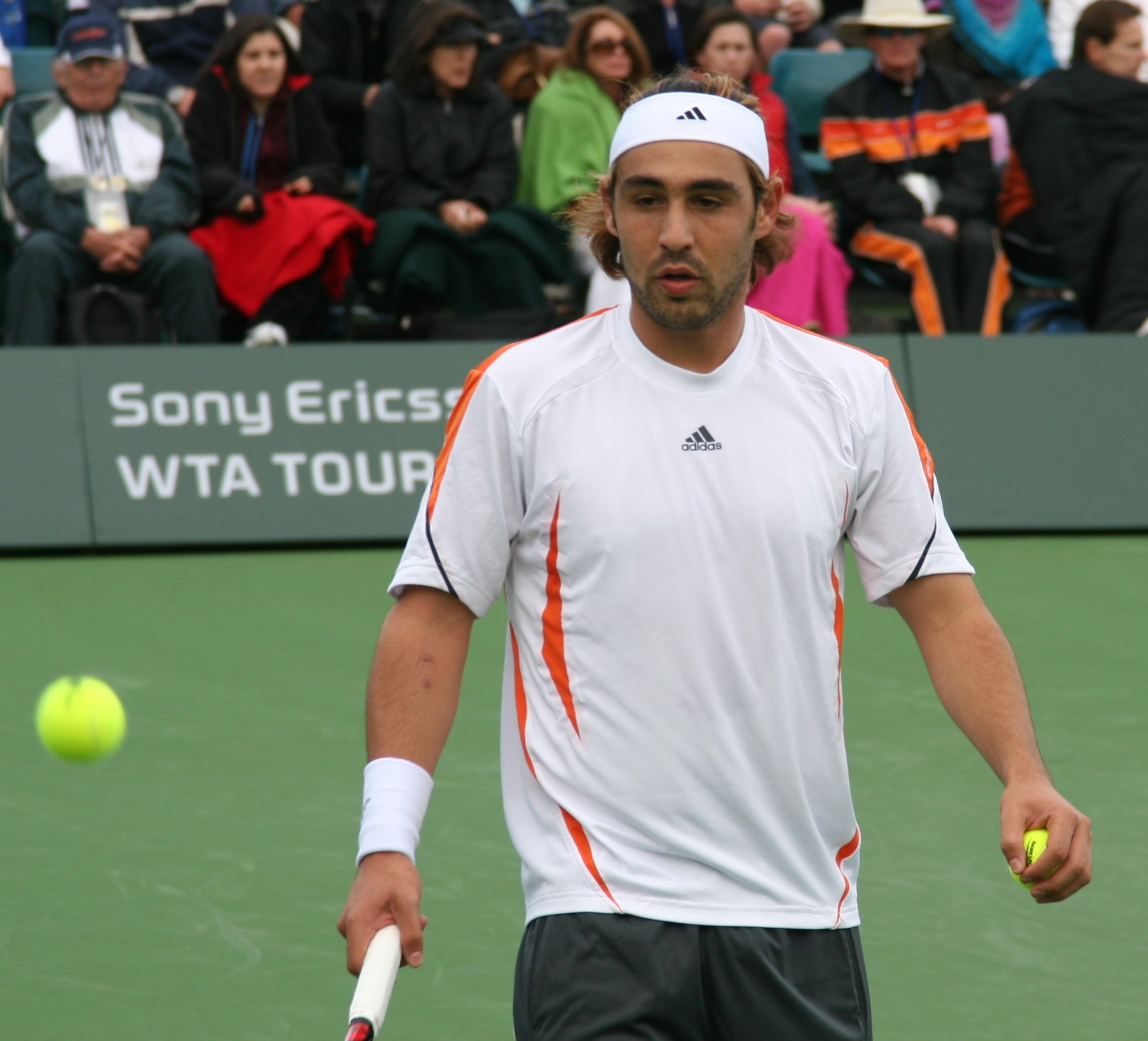
Baghdatis at Indian Wells in 2006

Baghdatis entered the Australian Open as an unseeded player, under the coaching of Guillaume Peyre, and produced an unexpected four-set victory over second-seed and world No. 3, Andy Roddick, in the fourth round. He then defeated the seventh seed Ivan Ljubičić in the quarterfinals in five sets. In the semifinals, he came back from two sets down to defeat fourth seed David Nalbandian in five. The vocal support he enjoyed from his local fans (consisting mostly of members of Melbourne's large Greek Australian community) throughout the tournament was considered one of the highlights of the tournament. In the final, Baghdatis started strongly (being a set and a break up with a chance to double break), but eventually lost to world No. 1, Roger Federer, in four sets.

"I think my coach will watch and I'll be sleeping with my girlfriend."

— Marcos Baghdatis answering an interviewer's question if he would be watching his next opponent in the 2006 Australian Open.

At the French Open, Baghdatis lost in the second round in five sets to Julien Benneteau. At Wimbledon, Baghdatis defeated Andy Murray in the fourth round in straight sets. In the quarterfinals, Baghdatis beat the 2002 champion and former world No. 1, Lleyton Hewitt. Baghdatis then lost to Rafael Nadal in the semifinals in three sets. At the US Open, Baghdatis defeated Alexander Waske in the first round. He played retiring Andre Agassi in the second round, and in a long match that lasted past midnight, Baghdatis lost in five sets. This was to be the final victory of Agassi's twenty-year professional career, as he lost to Benjamin Becker in the following round. At the China Open, an ATP International Series event, Baghdatis defeated Mario Ančić in the final for his first career ATP tournament championship.

=== 2007: Second singles title ===
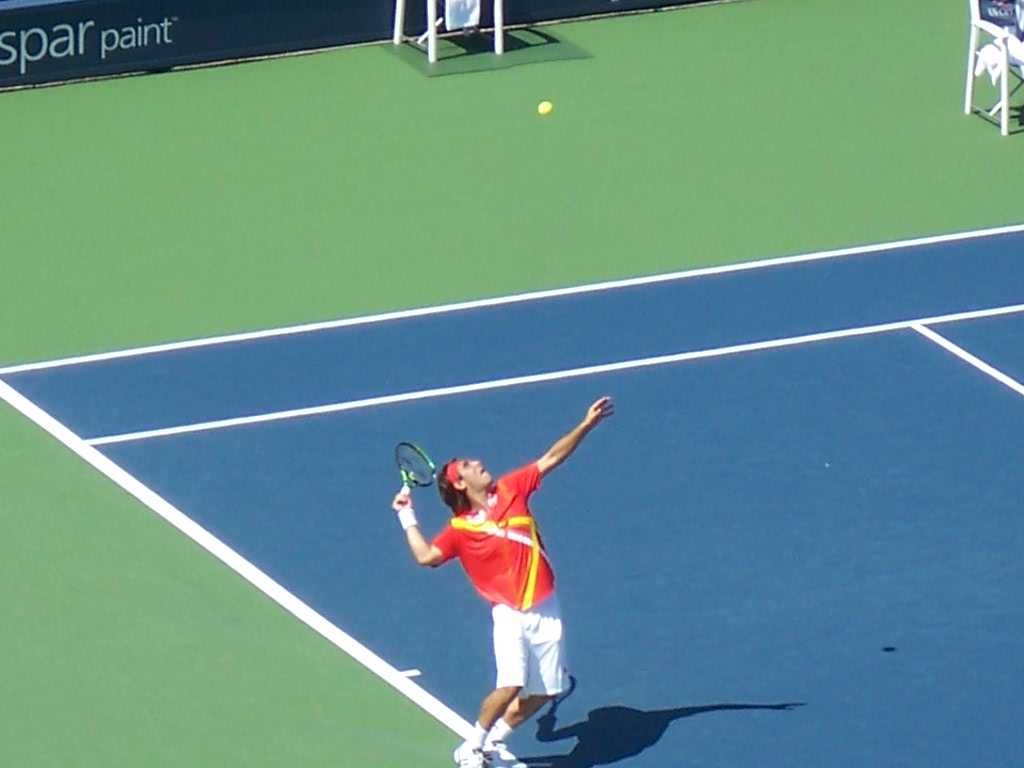
Marcos Baghdatis serving at the 2007 US Open

Baghdatis was the eleventh seed at the Australian Open but could not match his success from the previous year, losing a second-round match to Gaël Monfils in four sets. He won his next tournament in Zagreb, defeating Ivan Ljubičić in a three-set final. At the Open 13 tournament in Marseille, France, Baghdatis advanced to his second consecutive singles final and the fifth of his career, where he lost to Gilles Simon in two sets. At the French Open, Baghdatis defeated Sébastien Grosjean in the first round and Kristian Pless to advance to the third round. There, he defeated Jan Hájek. In the fourth round, Baghdatis lost to Igor Andreev in four sets.

At the first grass-court tournament of the season in Halle, Baghdatis reached his sixth career singles final by defeating Philipp Kohlschreiber in the semifinals. In the final, which took place on his birthday, he lost to Tomáš Berdych. At Wimbledon, as the tenth seed, he made it to the quarterfinals for the second straight year, defeating Ernests Gulbis, Nicolas Devilder, David Nalbandian, and sixth seed Nikolay Davydenko, before losing to Novak Djokovic in a five-hour match. At the next Grand Slam, the US Open, Baghdatis was defeated by no. 106 ranked Max Mirnyi in the first round. At the Paris Masters, Baghdatis found good form. He reached the semifinals by defeating Nikolay Davydenko and Tommy Robredo. He then lost to second seed Rafael Nadal, in three sets.

=== 2008–2009: Injuries ===
Baghdatis started his season on the 2008 ATP Tour at the Chennai Open in India, where he lost to Robin Haase in the first round. At the Australian Open, Baghdatis defeated 2002 champion Thomas Johansson and 2005 champion Marat Safin, before losing in the third round to 2005 runner-up Lleyton Hewitt, in five sets. This match lasted 282 minutes, beginning at 11:52 pm and finishing at 4:34 am. At the French Open, he lost in the first round to Simone Bolelli in three sets. At the 2008 Halle Open in Germany he lost to Roger Federer in the quarterfinals. At the Wimbledon Championships, seeded tenth, Baghdatis progressed to the fourth round, where he lost to Feliciano López in five sets. Baghdatis suffered injuries for the remainder of the season and did not participate in the US Open.

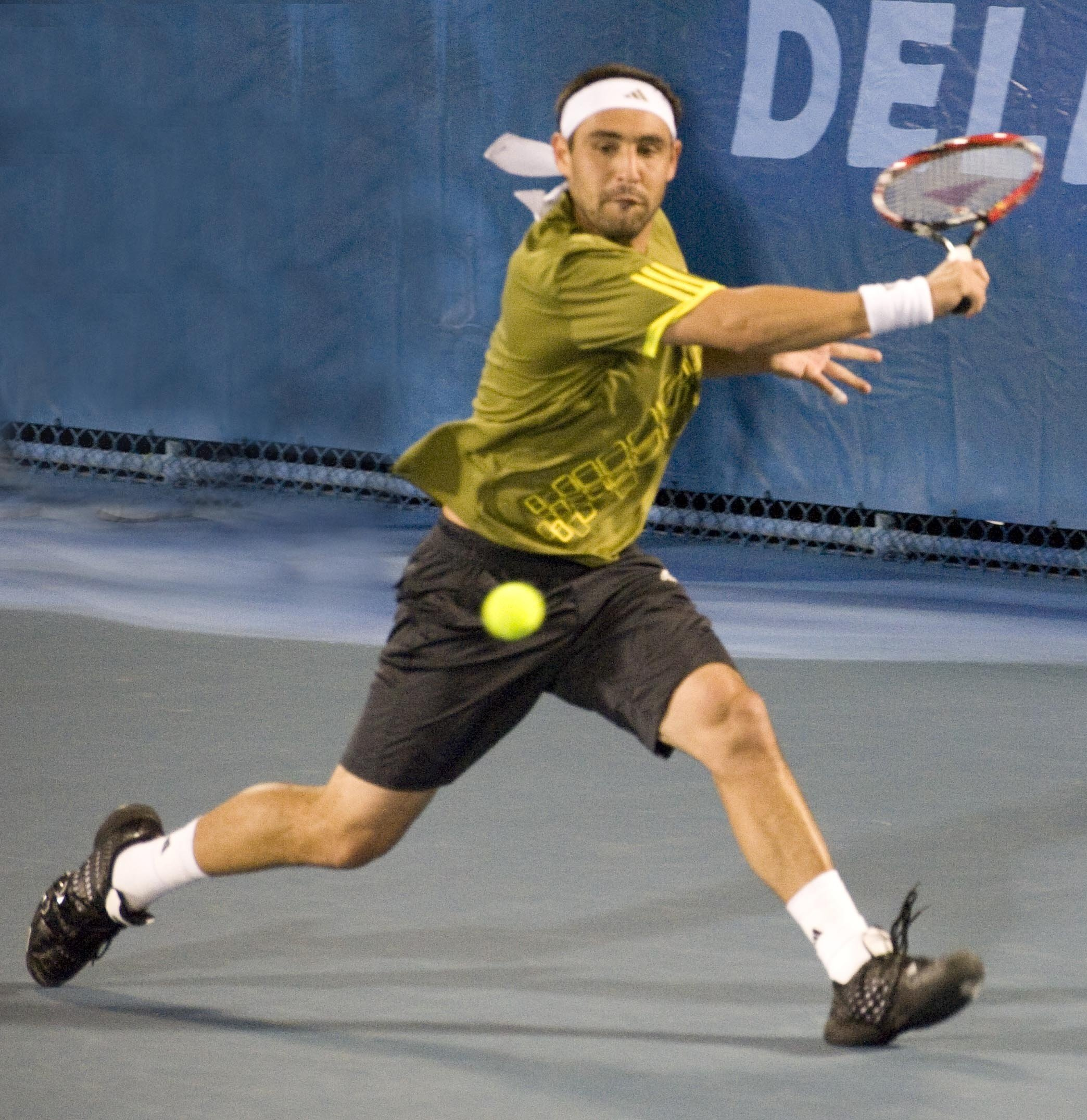
Marcos Baghdatis at 2009 Delray Beach International

Entering 2009, ranked No. 96 (his best having been 8) and having not played since the ATP Paris Masters in late October 2008, Baghdatis entered the Brisbane International in preparation for the Australian Open, losing in the opening round to Jarkko Nieminen.

In the Australian Open, traditionally his best grand slam event, he began with a straight-sets win over 48th-ranked Frenchman Julien Benneteau and followed that up by ousting 16th-seed Robin Söderling in four sets and 23rd-seed Mardy Fish in straight sets. In the fourth round he lost in four sets to Novak Djokovic.

After the Australian Open, he played in the SA Tennis Open tournament in Johannesburg and was the eighth seed. He defeated Andrew Anderson and Raven Klaasen. In the quarterfinals, he lost to David Ferrer in two sets. After getting a wild card for San Jose, he drew Sam Querrey in the first round, and lost in three tight sets. At the Delray Beach International Championships, Baghdatis defeated Ernests Gulbis and Dudi Sela before losing to Jérémy Chardy in the quarterfinals in two tiebreaks. Baghdatis found some form at the Ordina Open 's-Hertogenbosch 250 tournament, beating 15th-ranked Tommy Robredo 7–5, 6–2, to move into the second round. In the second round, he suffered a match-ending knee injury when playing Raemon Sluiter.

Due to the knee injury suffered at 's-Hertogenbosch, he withdrew from the Wimbledon Championships. Baghdatis returned to the ATP Tour with a three-set loss to Wayne Odesnik in Indianapolis. In Los Angeles, he progressed to the second round after beating Frank Dancevic but was upset by John Isner in straight sets, after holding a set point in the second set. Baghdatis won the Odlum Brown Vancouver Open, a Challenger event over Xavier Malisse in the final. The title was his first at any level since triumphing at the ATP World Tour 250 tennis tournament in Zagreb in February 2007.

Baghdatis failed to qualify for the Cincinnati Masters, losing to Robert Kendrick in the opening qualifying round. He won his second ATP Challenger Tour title of the season, after defeating Xavier Malisse again, in the final of the Trophée des Alpilles in St. Remy. He won his opening match in the ATP 250 tournament in Kuala Lumpur, against Lu Yen-hsun, but was beaten by Mikhail Youzhny in straight sets in the next round.

In the China Open, an ATP 500 tournament held in Beijing, he drew top seeded Rafael Nadal in the first round. He pushed him hard, but was eventually defeated. It was Nadal's sixth straight win over the Cypriot. At the 2009 If Stockholm Open, Baghdatis reached his first ATP final since 2007 at Halle. In the opening round, he upset third seeded Juan Carlos Ferrero in straight sets. He followed this up with crushing victories over Robert Kendrick and Arnaud Clément. Top-seed Robin Söderling gave Marcos a walkover into the final. Baghdatis beat Rochus in the final to win just his third ATP title, which ended his two and a half year title drought.

=== 2010: Return to top 20 ===
During the 2010 season, Baghdatis was the only player to beat both Roger Federer and Rafael Nadal while they were world No. 1.

The 2010 season saw Baghdatis return to form. He started off the year at the Brisbane International beating Mardy Fish before losing to Tomáš Berdych, winning just one game. He then entered the Medibank International tournament in Sydney, where he beat Nick Lindahl, Viktor Troicki and Lleyton Hewitt, rallying from a set and a break down in the second set to win in a three-sets quarterfinal. Then he defeated Mardy Fish in another heart-stopping three-set win on a final set tie break in the semifinals. In the final, he faced Richard Gasquet. After a rain delay at the start of the second set, Baghdatis went on to a straight-sets victory, a win which elevated his ATP ranking to No. 31.

At the Australian Open, Baghdatis beat Paolo Lorenzi in the opening round and 17th seed David Ferrer in the five-sets second round. This marked his second career victory after being down two sets to none, while suffering from leg cramping in the final game. A right shoulder injury forced Baghdatis to retire just 56 minutes into his third round match against Hewitt after trailing 0–6, 2–4. After this, his ranking dipped slightly to No. 34 (on 1 January).

In Rotterdam he beat James Blake in a comfortable two-sets victory, but lost to in-form Nikolay Davydenko in the second round. Baghdatis made a second-round appearance at the Open 13 tournament in Marseille, losing to eventual champion Michaël Llodra. He then appeared at the Dubai Championships, but came into the tournament with stomach cramps (due to food poisoning). Despite the handicap, he beat No. 8 seed Gilles Simon and then beat Somdev Devvarman and Michael Berrer. In the semifinals, after being a set and a break up, he lost a frustrating match against No. 2 seed and defending champion Novak Djokovic.

At the Indian Wells Masters he beat Arnaud Clément in the second round. In the third round, he captured his biggest win to date, stunning world No. 1 Roger Federer in three sets, while saving three match points. By beating Federer for the first time in his career, he reversed a six-match losing streak. However, in the fourth round, he was unable to recuperate in time, losing to Tommy Robredo, despite coming into the match with a 3–0 head-to-head lifetime against Robredo.

At the Miami Open he beat Juan Ignacio Chela and in the third round, he lost to seventh seed Marin Čilić in straight sets. Baghdatis had a disappointing start to the clay-court season, being eliminated in the first rounds of both the Monte-Carlo Masters and the Rome Masters by Albert Montañés and Ernests Gulbis, respectively. He next played in the BMW Open, where he beat Peter Gojowczyk in three sets, Marco Chiudinelli in straight set and Philipp Kohlschreiber in two sets. For a spot in the final, Baghdatis took on first seed Marin Čilić. Despite taking the first set, Baghdatis was unable to close out the match, eventually losing in three erratic sets. He then made a quarterfinal appearance at the Open de Nice Côte d'Azur as the fifth seed, where he was upset by Argentinian Leonardo Mayer in three sets, despite saving 21 of 24 break points in the match.

At the French Open, Baghdatis was beaten by Britain's Andy Murray in the third round in four sets. He suffered a surprisingly poor run in the 2010 grass-court season. He went out in the first rounds in all three grass court tournaments he entered by Philipp Petzschner in Halle, Peter Luczak in s-Hertogenbosch, and Lukáš Lacko at Wimbledon. It was the worst showing he had had in Wimbledon, and even more disappointing as he had a good history record in the past few years there. However, a reshuffle behind the scenes after the grass court season has resulted in Baghdatis once again working with Guillaume Perye.

He reached the quarterfinals at the Farmers Classic in Los Angeles, where he lost to Janko Tipsarević for the first time in their third meeting, and reached the final at the Legg Mason Tennis Classic in Washington, where he lost to in-form David Nalbandian. Baghdatis was ousted in the opening round at the Rogers Cup in Toronto, losing to Jérémy Chardy in three sets. At the Cincinnati Masters, he found decent form. In the first round, he beat Marin Čilić for the first time. In the second round, he toughed out a three-sets victory over Brazilian Thomaz Bellucci, followed by a two-sets victory in the third round against Tomáš Berdych. In the quarterfinals, after six successive losses against the Spaniard, he finally defeated Rafael Nadal for the first time in his career. It was his second win over a world No. 1 that year, having earlier defeated then-No. 1 Roger Federer at the Indian Wells Masters. Oddly, he defeated a world-number-one player on his seventh attempt again. As he stated back in March 2010 after beating Federer, "Seven is my lucky number." For only the second time, he made the semifinals of a Masters 1000 tournament, but here he could not beat Roger Federer again, as he succumbed to his in-form opponent in two sets.

Just before his campaign at the US Open, he made an appearance at the last tune-up tournament, the 2010 Pilot Pen Tennis in New Haven, Connecticut. Baghdatis had a chance to win the year's US Open Series if he won this tournament. Appearing as the top seeded player, he beat Igor Andreev for the first time and then came back from a set down to defeat Juan Ignacio Chela to reach the quarterfinals. However, he lost to the eventual champion, Sergiy Stakhovsky on a final-set tie break in the quarterfinals. Arriving at the US Open, he lost in the first round in five sets to Arnaud Clément.

=== 2011: Solid season ===
Baghdatis started the 2011 season by competing in the Brisbane International, losing in the quarterfinal to defending champion and second-seeded American Andy Roddick in two sets. He made it to the third round of the Australian Open, before retiring midway through the fourth set against Jürgen Melzer due to a finger injury. Baghdatis had a very quiet summer on the ATP tour, his most noticeable appearance was at the Wimbledon Championships where he was the 32nd seed and gave eventual winner Novak Djokovic a tough test in the third round, losing in four sets, during a point in the match Djokovic was unable to keep his cool on the Centre Court and at the end of losing a long rally repeatedly hit the grass court with his racket. As the match progressed, Baghdatis received a rapturous support from the home crowd, to the point where they were screaming every point he won.

Just before the US Series, Baghdatis teamed up with British coach Miles Maclagan. Baghdatis found some form in the Kuala Lumpur, where he was runner up to a determined Janko Tipsarević. In Tokyo, Baghdatis lost narrowly to Andy Murray in three sets. After the match Murray commented kindly that, "I think he played very well. At the end of the third set, we were both playing good tennis, but in the first two he was the better player. Marcos is a very, very good player. He might not have played his best tennis so far this year, but he has been close to the top 10 before. He has a lot of talent, a big serve and has many ways to hurt you on the court."

=== 2012: Promising signs ===
In the Australian Open, Baghdatis lost in the second round to Stan Wawrinka. During a change over Baghdatis smashed and broke four of his tennis rackets to vent frustration on how the match was unfolding. He was fined A$770 by the organization of the Australian Open for this behaviour. Baghdatis played Andy Murray in the third round of Wimbledon playing under the closed roof until 11:03pm, eventually losing in four sets. In July 2012 Baghdatis was selected by the Cypriot Olympic Committee to carry the Cypriot flag in the Opening Ceremony of the London 2012 Games. In the interrupted first-round match on 29–30 August, against Go Soeda of Japan, he won in three sets before scoring an impressive straight-sets victory over Richard Gasquet in the second round. Although he lost in the third round to Andy Murray in three sets, Baghdatis was the only player who won a set off Murray on the latter's run to Olympic gold.

=== 2013: Struggles with injuries and form ===
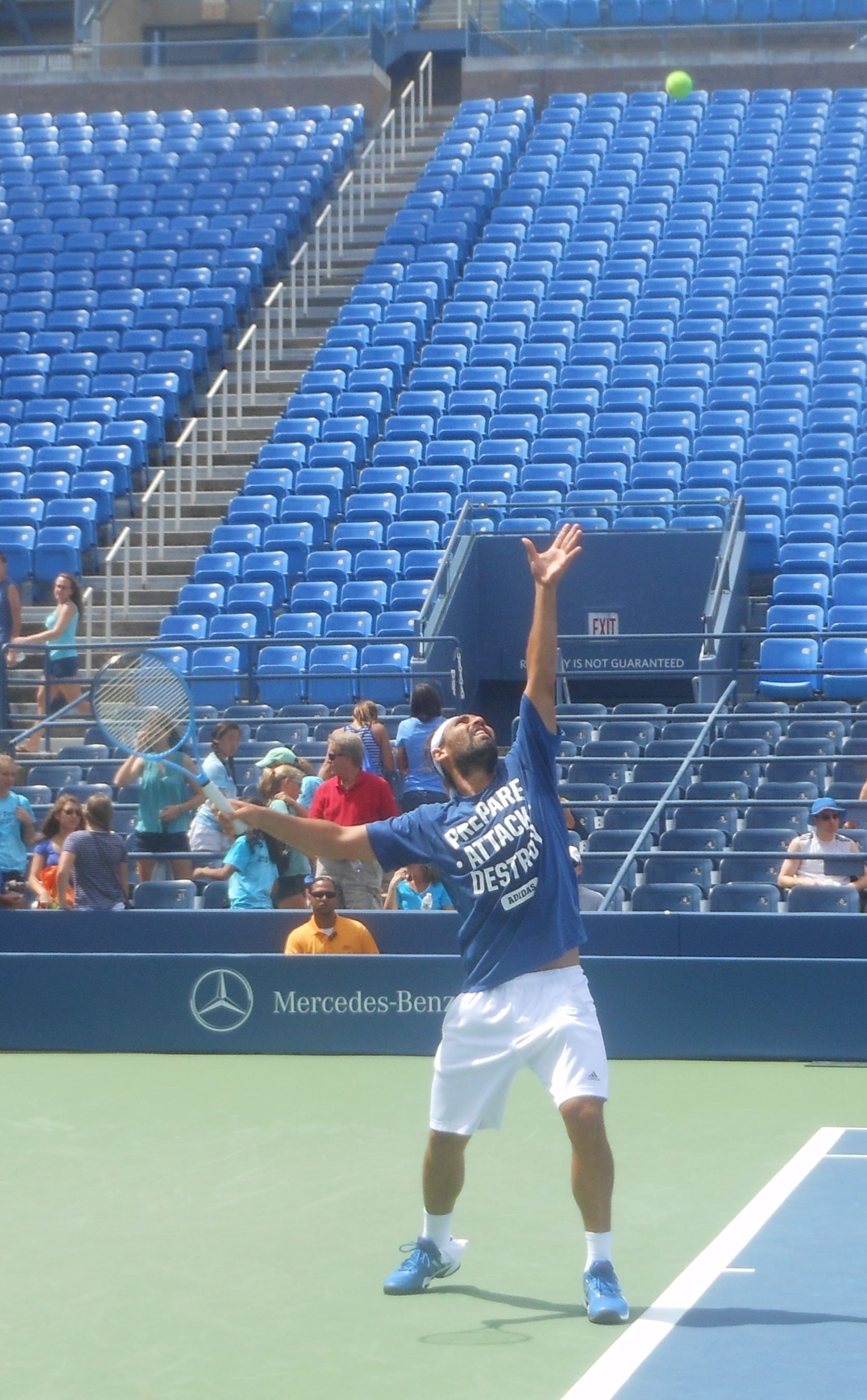
Baghdatis serves at the 2013 US Open.

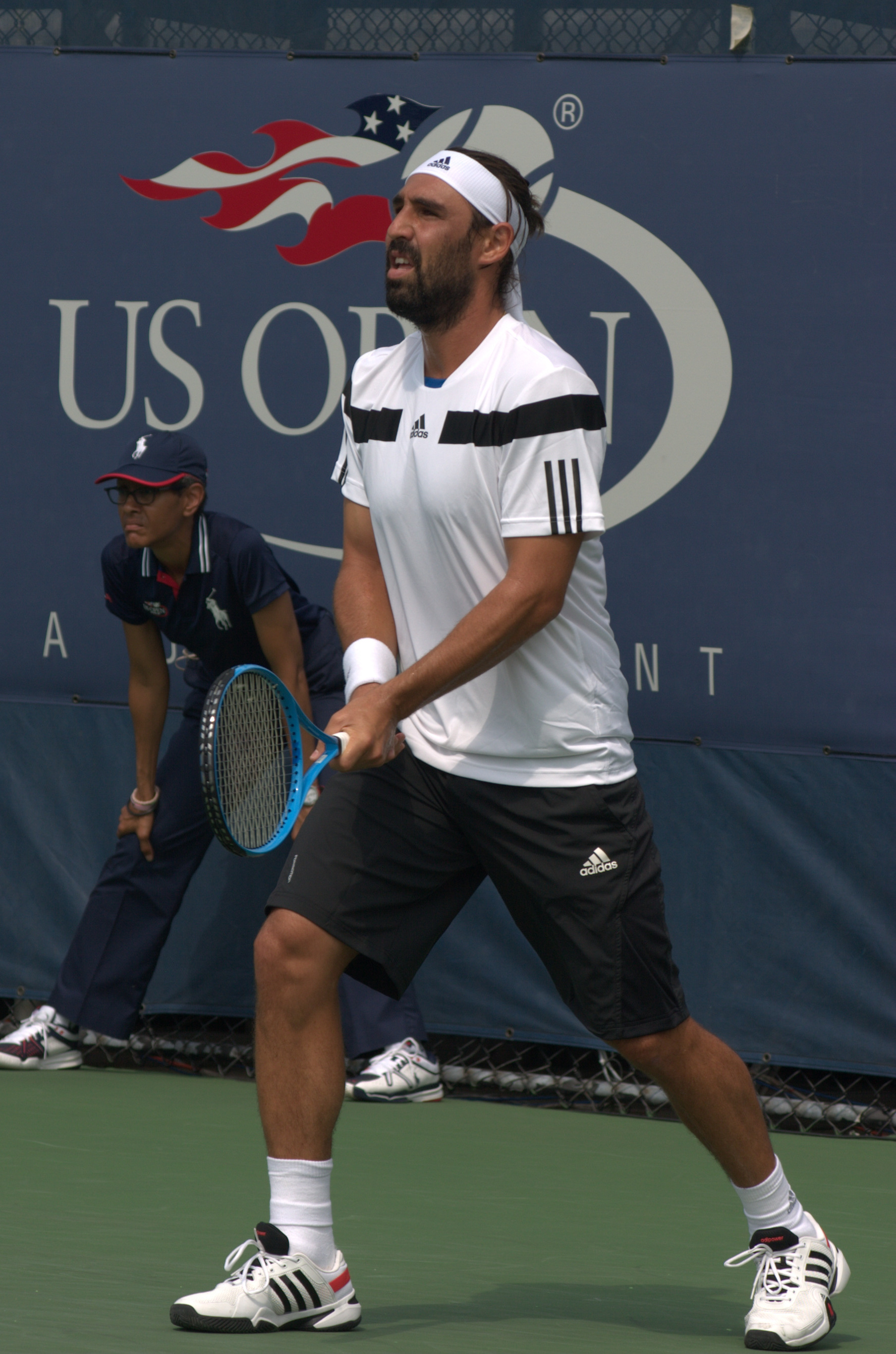
Marcos Baghdatis at the 2013 US Open

Baghdatis entered the Australian Open as the 28th seed. He defeated Albert Ramos in the first round and Tatsuma Ito of Japan in the second round. However, he was defeated by the 4th seed David Ferrer in the third round in straight sets. At the French Open, Baghdatis lost in the first round to the 24th seed Benoît Paire. At Wimbledon, Baghdatis was defeated in the first round by the 10th seed Marin Čilić.

After a poor run of form over the summer, Baghdatis found some rhythm at the Citi Open in Washington. He had impressive wins over Lukáš Lacko in three sets and 11th-ranked and second seed Kei Nishikori whom he defeated with the loss of three games to reach the quarterfinals. There he was defeated by eventual finalist John Isner in a competitive three set match. At the US Open, Baghdatis defeated Tatsuma Ito in the first round. In the second round, he produced a convincing performance against the 17th seed Kevin Anderson, winning in straight sets and losing only six games. In the third round, he was defeated by an in-form Stan Wawrinka in four sets.

In his next two tournaments, he was defeated by Dmitry Tursunov at St. Petersburg in the first round, and was defeated by Wawrinka at the Malaysian Open in Kuala Lumpur in the second round. At the Japan Open in Tokyo, he was defeated in the opening round by top-seeded Juan Martín del Potro in three sets after a decent performance. At the Swiss Indoors in Basel, Baghdatis defeated Benjamin Becker in the first round before losing in the second round to top-seeded and eventual champion Juan Martín del Potro in two sets.

=== 2014: Challenger Tour ===
Baghdatis was not given a wildcard into the Brisbane International, although he did receive one for the Heineken Open in Auckland. In the opening round Baghdatis lost to American lucky loser Steve Johnson in three sets. Baghdatis entered the Australian Open, ranked at a low 109 in the ATP rankings. Despite recovering from 1–4 down in the second set and saving several match points in the third set, he was eventually bundled out by Denis Istomin in straight sets in the first round.

Due to a low ranking, he needed to qualify for his next tournament at the Zagreb Indoors. His poor run of form continued as he was defeated by 19-year-old Peđa Krstin from Serbia in the opening qualifying round. Over March, after Baghdatis split with his coach, Baghdatis had found some form again with a good run at the Sony Open in Miami, where he defeated Santiago Giraldo and Philipp Kohlschreiber in a three-set battle that ended with two tiebreaks. He had another memorable match in the third round against Tsonga, but he could not convert his chances and lost in three sets after more than two hours.

Baghdatis started the clay-court season with a first-round loss at the U.S. Clay Court Championships in Houston to Alejandro González. After a tough period through injuries, Baghdatis opted to find his way up the rankings again through the ATP Challenger Tour. Baghdatis finished in the Top 100 for the tenth straight year with best results coming at Challenger level (22–2 record), winning four titles: Nottingham (d. Matosevic) in June, back-to-back in Vancouver (d. Dustov) and Aptos (d. Kukushkin) in August and Geneva (d. Przysiezny) in November.

Baghdatis ended the year at No. 85 in the ATP rankings.

=== 2015: Resurgence on ATP World Tour; back into top 50 ===
Sitting at No. 85 in the rankings, Baghdatis decided to begin his 2015 season on the ATP Challenger Tour, at the city of Onkaparinga. He made the final, before bowing out to American Ryan Harrison in straight sets. Baghdatis returned to the Australian Open, where he beat Teymuraz Gabashvili in five sets and 22nd-ranked David Goffin in four sets with an impressive display of attacking tennis. Baghdatis's campaign ended in dramatic fashion in round 3 against Grigor Dimitrov. The Cypriot rode the abundant emotion and Greek chanting on showcourt 3 to twice lead by a set before Dimitrov found another gear to win in five sets.

After the match, Baghdatis stated his goal was to finish 2015 in the world's top 50, believing in 4–5 years he can reach the world's top 10 again.

After a promising Australian summer, Baghdatis returned to Europe. He defeated Ivo Karlović and Mikhail Youznhey on his way to the Zagreb semifinals (l. to Garcia-Lopez). At the Dubai Tennis Championships, Baghdatis defeated for the second time this season David Goffin, before being forced to retire hurt in a final set tie-breaker against Borna Ćorić in the second round.

At Roland Garros, Baghdatis stunned 25th ranked Ivo Karlović for the second time this season, winning in three sets. However, he was defeated in the second round by Damir Džumhur in four sets. Baghdatis's grass-court campaign began in Stuttgart, where despite losing, he showed encouraging signs in his three set loss to superstar Rafael Nadal. This promise was fulfilled in an incredible week of ball striking at Nottingham. Baghdatis stunned world No. 7 David Ferrer, young gun Alexander Zverev and Simone Bolleli to his way to the semifinals. However, Baghdatis, with an early break ahead against Denis Istomin, was forced to retire hurt after feeling a 'pop' in his calf muscle. It ended a great week for the Cypriot, who obtained his first top-ten win in more than two years.

At Wimbledon, his campaign was in doubt due to the calf injury suffered at Nottingham. However, he decided to participate, and with his left calf heavily strapped, he defeated Donald Young in four sets in the opening round. In round 2, Baghdatis, struggling with his calf injury and form, was trailing two sets and a break down against Australian qualifier John Millman. However, the Cypriot produced one of the most incredible comebacks in recent Grand Slam history to defeat Millman in over three hours. Baghdatis ran out of gas in round 3, with David Goffin exacting revenge against the Cypriot with a comfortable victory.

Baghdatis's resurgence continued at the Atlanta Open to kick-off his US Open swing. Baghdatis, defeated Austin Krajicek, Sam Groth and Vasek Pospisil on his way to the semifinals. There, Baghdatis stunned Gilles Müller to reach the final. In the final, Baghdatis obtained a right groin injury early in the match, severely hampering his performance in his loss to John Isner. It was Baghdatis's first appearance in an ATP World Tour final since 2011.

Unfortunately, due to the groin injury suffered in Atlanta, Baghdatis was forced to pull out of the events following Atlanta, except for Winston-Salem (first round loss to Pierre-Hugues Herbert). At the US Open, Baghdatis was forced once again to pull out of the tournament in the middle of his opening-round match against Steve Darcis. He retired hurt again citing his right groin.

Baghdatis was solid on the ATP World Tour over the coming months. He reached the round of 16 at St. Petersburg, Kuala Lumpur and Tokyo.

His final tournament of the season was in Stockholm for the Stockholm Open, where he beat Sam Querrey, Bernard Tomic and Gilles Müller in the quarterfinals. However, Baghdatis's right groin injury again forced him to retire from a match, where he retired in the second set of his semifinal against top seed Tomáš Berdych.

The Cypriot enjoyed an 11th straight finish in top 10, improved to 63–13 lifetime in Davis Cup thanks to doubles win over Greece in July and posted 26 tour-level wins in 2015, four more than 2013–14 combined. Baghdatis ended the year at No. 46 in the ATP rankings and will hope to continue his resurgence in 2016.

=== 2016: Top 40 return, Dubai finalist ===
Baghdatis, due to the birth of his second daughter, began his 2016 campaign only a few days before the Australian Open at the exhibition Kooyong Classic where he had competitive matches with Pablo Carreño and Paul-Henri Mathieu. At the Australian Open, where Baghdatis was unseeded, he drew ninth seed Jo-Wilfred Tsonga in a match between two former finalists. Despite playing some vintage tennis in the second set his lack of match play showed in his four-sets defeat. Baghdatis reflecting on the loss, said "I played a good match. It was my first match of the year and I lack a bit of rhythm, especially under pressure. I had some chances in the third set but the lack of matches before the tournament made me make wrong decisions at those moments."

Baghdatis next participated at the ATP 250 tournament, Open Sud de France. Baghdatis defeated Lukáš Lacko and saved seven second set setpoints against Taro Daniel, winning in straight sets. In the quarterfinal he was beaten in two sets by Richard Gasquet. Baghdatis next moved onto Rotterdam, where he competed at the ABN AMRO ATP-500-tournament. He was drawn against fourth seed David Goffin and achieved a three-sets victory, coming back from a 5–2 deficit in the third set tiebreak. He improved to 4–1 against Goffin in their head-to-head. Baghdatis's run ended in Rotterdam after round two, with a two-sets defeat to eventual champion, Martin Kližan.

Baghdatis continued his resurgence at the prestigious Dubai Tennis Championships. Baghdatis, stunned Viktor Troicki, Vasek Pospisil, Bautista Agut and Feliciano López on his way to the final. He lost to Stan Wawrinka in the final, including a near 30-minute tiebreaker in the second set. Baghdatis, re-entered the world's top 40 for the first time in three years, and hit form that was present from ten years before. Baghdatis said after the final: "I didn't win the tournament this week but I won a lot more, I won my confidence back. I'm happy I'm back and playing this kind of tennis now. It's just to continue improving and play at this level throughout the year."

Traditionally his worst surface, Baghdatis began his clay-court season in Houston. He recorded the first double-bagel victory of his career in the opening round against Diego Schwartzman, before stunning Fernando Verdasco to reach the quarterfinals. He was defeated by eventual finalist Jack Sock. Baghdatis, however, struggled once again for majority of the clay-court season, recording first-round losses in Bucharest and Madrid, while pulling out of a number of other tournaments. At Roland Garros, Baghdatis recorded an impressive straight-sets win over Giles Muller, before despite winning the first two sets, bowing out in a thriller to Jo-Wilfred Tsonga in five sets.

Baghdatis produced solid, without spectacular results over the coming months. He made the quarterfinals in both Halle and Nottingham on grass, with his run in Halle en route to a straight-sets victory over world No. 8, Tomáš Berdych. He was disappointed at Wimbledon, ousted in straight sets to John Isner. He extended his grass-court season in Newport, and made the semifinals before bowing out to eventual champion Ivo Karlović.

Baghdatis was forced to pull out of the Olympic Games in Rio due an elbow injury. He stated "It is clear that unless I am 100% fit and healthy to compete, I shall not participate at the Olympics because I would be doing injustice to my country."

=== 2017–2018: Last ATP final, outside of top 100 ===
Baghdatis lost in the first round in seven out of the 15 ATP tournaments he played during the 2017 year. His continued struggle with form saw his year-end ranking fall outside the top 100 for the first time since 2004. Similar results with numerous first round exits followed in 2018, with Baghdatis finishing the year ranked 125.

At the 2017 Chengdu Open, Baghdatis made his last ATP final where he lost against Denis Istomin after being forced to retire in the first set due to a back injury.

At the 2018 Indian Wells Masters, Baghdatis went on a run to the fourth round as a qualifier defeating Yoshihito Nishioka, 14th seed Diego Schwartzman, and Dudi Sela along the way. He withdrew from his fourth round match against Milos Raonic due to injury. The result would earn him a wildcard into the 2018 Miami Masters the next week. He lost to Jared Donaldson in the first round in straight sets.

At the 2018 Wimbledon Championships, Baghdatis won his last match over a top-10 when he defeated world No. 7, Dominic Thiem, in the first round.

=== 2019: Retirement ===
At the 2019 Open Sud de France, Baghdatis qualified for the main draw and defeated top seed and defending champion Lucas Pouille in the second round to make the quarterfinals. He lost to Radu Albot in the quarterfinals in straight sets. He received a wildcard into Dubai Open two weeks later where he won his opening match against fellow wildcard Mohamed Safwat but lost in the next round to Gaël Monfils in straight sets. Two more weeks later, he won the 2019 Pingshan Open as the 2nd seed defeating Stefano Napolitano in the final. It would be his first challenger title in over four years and the last title of his career.

Baghdatis announced that he would retire and that the 2019 Wimbledon Championships would be his last tournament. He received a wild-card entry into the main draw and defeated Brayden Schnur in the first round in straight sets which would be his last win of his career. On 4 July 2019, he lost to Matteo Berrettini in the second round in straight sets for his last match. He was cheered by fans in the stadium as he was leaving the court in tears. Many fellow players such as Roger Federer praised his retirement and he was honored as one of the biggest retirees in 2019.

== Davis Cup ==
Baghdatis made his Davis Cup debut for the Cyprus Davis Cup team in 2000 as a 14-year-old. Upon making his debut Cyprus were competing in the lowest division of Davis Cup competition possible and fell one win shy of being promoted in 2000. In 2009, the Group II relegation play-off tie was held in Nicosia, Cyprus and Baghdatis led the team. They fell one match short of advancing to the Euro/Africa Group I, after leading two sets to love in the doubles against Finland, Baghdatis and Photos Kallias lost the rubber, and Cyprus lost the tie 2–3.

Baghdatis is one of the most successful Davis Cup players in the modern era. He has the longest winning streak in Davis Cup matches of all time with 36 consecutive singles victories, surpassing (in 2016) the previously held record of 33 by Björn Borg.

== 2008 Australian Open controversy ==
Two days before his third-round match against Lleyton Hewitt at the 2008 Australian Open, a video posted on YouTube almost a year earlier made headlines in the local media. The video shows Baghdatis at a barbecue hosted by his Greek Australian fans in Melbourne in early 2007. In it, Baghdatis is seen holding a flare chanting, among other things, pro-Cyprus slogans such as "Turks out of Cyprus" twice, with the Hellas Fan Club, a group which was later at the centre of a clash with police. A representative of the local Turkish Cypriot community referred to the chant as a "racist attack" and a "straight-forward provocation of our community", and called for the player's expulsion from the tournament and Australia, though no such action was taken.

Supporters of Baghdatis said he was not calling for Turkish Cypriots to leave Cyprus but, rather, an end to Turkey's military occupation since 1974. In a statement issued through his manager, Baghdatis said he was "supporting the interest of my country Cyprus, while protesting against a situation that is not recognized by the United Nations".

== Grand Slam finals ==
=== Singles: 1 (1 runner-up) ===
Result	Year	Championship	Surface	Opponent	Score
Loss	2006	Australian Open	Hard	(Switzerland) Roger Federer	7–5, 5–7, 0–6, 2–6

== ATP career finals ==
=== Singles: 14 (4 titles, 10 runner-ups) ===
Legend Grand Slam tournaments (0–1) ATP World Tour Masters 1000 (0–0) ATP World Tour 500 Series (0–2) ATP World Tour 250 Series (4–7)	Finals by surface Hard (3–8) Clay (0–0) Grass (0–1) Carpet (1–1)	Finals by setting Outdoor (2–6) Indoor (2–4)

Result	W–L	Date	Tournament	Tier	Surface	Opponent	Score
Loss	0–1	Oct 2005	Swiss Indoors, Basel	International	Carpet (i)	(Chile) Fernando González	7–6^{(12–10)}, 3–6, 5–7, 4–6
Loss	0–2	Jan 2006	Australian Open, Melbourne	Grand Slam	Hard	(Switzerland) Roger Federer	7–5, 5–7, 0–6, 2–6
Win	1–2	Sep 2006	China Open, Beijing	International	Hard	(Croatia) Mario Ančić	6–4, 6–0
Win	2–2	Feb 2007	Zagreb Indoors, Croatia	International	Carpet (i)	(Croatia) Ivan Ljubičić	7–6^{(7–4)}, 4–6, 6–4
Loss	2–3	Feb 2007	Open 13, Marseille	International	Hard (i)	(France) Gilles Simon	4–6, 6–7^{(3–7)}
Loss	2–4	Jun 2007	Halle Open, Germany	International	Grass	(Czech Republic) Tomáš Berdych	5–7, 4–6
Win	3–4	Oct 2009	Stockholm Open, Sweden	250 Series	Hard (i)	(Belgium) Olivier Rochus	6–1, 7–5
Win	4–4	Jan 2010	Sydney International, Australia	250 Series	Hard	(France) Richard Gasquet	6–4, 7–6^{(7–2)}
Loss	4–5	Aug 2010	Washington Open, USA	500 Series	Hard	(Argentina) David Nalbandian	2–6, 6–7^{(4–7)}
Loss	4–6	Oct 2010	Kremlin Cup, Moscow	250 Series	Hard (i)	(Serbia) Viktor Troicki	6–3, 4–6, 3–6
Loss	4–7	Oct 2011	Malaysian Open, Kuala Lumpur	250 Series	Hard (i)	(Serbia) Janko Tipsarević	4–6, 5–7
Loss	4–8	Aug 2015	Atlanta Open, USA	250 Series	Hard	(United States) John Isner	3–6, 3–6
Loss	4–9	Feb 2016	Dubai Tennis Championships, UAE	500 Series	Hard	(Switzerland) Stan Wawrinka	4–6, 6–7^{(13–15)}
Loss	4–10	Oct 2017	Chengdu Open, China	250 Series	Hard	(Uzbekistan) Denis Istomin	2–3 ret.

=== Doubles: 3 (1 title, 2 runner-ups) ===
Legend Grand Slam tournaments (0–0) ATP World Tour Masters 1000 (0–0) ATP World Tour 500 Series (0–0) ATP World Tour 250 Series (1–2)	Finals by surface Hard (1–1) Clay (0–1) Grass (0–0) Carpet (0–0)	Finals by setting Outdoor (0–2) Indoor (1–0)

Result	W–L	Date	Tournament	Tier	Surface	Partner	Opponents	Score
Loss	0–1	Jan 2008	Chennai Open, India	International	Hard	(France) Marc Gicquel	(Thailand) Sanchai Ratiwatana (Thailand) Sonchat Ratiwatana	4–6, 5–7
Win	1–1	Feb 2012	Zagreb Indoors, Croatia	250 Series	Hard (i)	(Russia) Mikhail Youzhny	(Croatia) Ivan Dodig (Croatia) Mate Pavić	6–2, 6–2
Loss	1–2	May 2013	Bavarian Championships, Germany	250 Series	Clay	(United States) Eric Butorac	(Finland) Jarkko Nieminen (Russia) Dmitry Tursunov	1–6, 4–6

== Team Tennis Leagues ==
=== League finals: 3 (3 championships) ===
Finals by leagues International Premier Tennis League (IPTL) (1–0) Champions Tennis League (CTL) (2–0)	Finals by club teams Pune Marathas (1–0) Punjab Marshalls (1–0) DBS Singapore Slammers (1–0)	League table results 1st place (2) 2nd place (1)	Awards Season MVP: 1 (2014 CTL)

Place	Date	League	Location(s)	Surface(s)	Team	Teammates	Opponent teams
Champions (1st SZ)	Nov 2014	Champions Tennis League (CTL)	India	Hard	(India) Pune Marathas	(Australia) Pat Cash (Poland) Agnieszka Radwańska (India) Saketh Myneni	(India); Delhi Dreams: Runners-up (1st NZ); Mumbai Tennis Masters: 2nd NZ; Hyderabad Aces: 2nd SZ; Punjab Marshalls: 3rd NZ; Bangalore Raptors: 3rd SZ
Champions (1st ZA)	Nov–Dec 2015	Champions Tennis League (CTL)	India	Hard, Hard (i)	(India) Punjab Marshalls	(United Kingdom) Greg Rusedski (Ukraine) Elina Svitolina (India) Saketh Myneni	(India); Hyderabad Aces: Runners-up (1st ZB); Raipur Rangers: 2nd ZA; Nagpur Orangers: 2nd ZB; V Chennai Warriors: 3rd ZB; Mumbai Tennis Masters: 3rd ZA
Champions (2nd)	Dec 2016	International Premier Tennis League (IPTL)	UAE, India, Singapore, Japan	Hard (i), Hard	Singapore Slammers	(Australia) Nick Kyrgios (Brazil) Marcelo Melo (Spain) Carlos Moyá (Germany) Rainer Schüttler (Netherlands) Kiki Bertens	(India) Indian Aces: Runners-up (1st); Japan Warriors: 3rd (United Arab Emirates) UAE Royals: 4th

*(SZ): South Zone, (NZ): North Zone, (ZA): Zone A, (ZB): Zone B

== Challenger and Futures finals ==
=== Singles: 18 (15–3) ===
Legend ATP Challenger Tour (11–2) ITF Futures Tour (4–1)	Finals by surface Hard (12–2) Clay (2–1) Grass (1–0) Carpet (0–0)

Result	W–L	Date	Tournament	Tier	Surface	Opponent	Score
Win	1–0	Apr 2003	Greece F1, Syros	Futures	Hard	(Czech Republic) Petr Kralert	6–4, 6–2
Win	2–0	May 2003	Uzbekistan F4, Namangan	Futures	Hard	(South Africa) Louis Vosloo	6–1, 6–4
Win	3–0	Jun 2003	Netherlands F2, Alkmaar	Futures	Clay	(Argentina) Ignacio González King	6–3, 6–1
Loss	3–1	Jul 2003	France F12, Bourg-en-Bresse	Futures	Clay	(France) Jean-Christophe Faurel	5–7, 6–4, 2–6
Loss	3–2	Aug 2003	Bukhara, Uzbekistan	Challenger	Hard	(Germany) Marc-Kevin Goellner	5–7, 7–6^{(7–2)}, 6–7^{(4–7)}
Win	4–2	Oct 2003	Cyprus F1, Nicosia	Futures	Clay	(Greece) Konstantinos Economidis	7–6^{(7–5)}, 6–1
Win	5–2	Oct 2004	Bolton, Great Britain	Challenger	Hard (i)	(Netherlands) Peter Wessels	6–1, 3–6, 6–2
Win	6–2	Nov 2004	Bratislava, Slovakia	Challenger	Hard (i)	(Slovakia) Dominik Hrbatý	7–6^{(7–4)}, 7–6^{(7–3)}
Win	7–2	Jul 2005	Córdoba, Spain	Challenger	Hard	(Colombia) Alejandro Falla	6–3, 6–3
Win	8–2	Aug 2009	Vancouver, Canada	Challenger	Hard	(Belgium) Xavier Malisse	6–4, 6–4
Win	9–2	Sep 2009	St Remy, France	Challenger	Hard	(Belgium) Xavier Malisse	6–4, 6–1
Win	10–2	Oct 2009	Tashkent, Uzbekistan	Challenger	Hard	(Uzbekistan) Denis Istomin	6–3, 1–6, 6–3
Win	11–2	Jun 2014	Nottingham, UK	Challenger	Grass	(Australia) Marinko Matosevic	6–4, 6–3
Win	12–2	Aug 2014	Vancouver, Canada	Challenger	Hard	(Uzbekistan) Farrukh Dustov	7–6^{(8–6)}, 6–3
Win	13–2	Aug 2014	Aptos, USA	Challenger	Hard	(Kazakhstan) Mikhail Kukushkin	7–6^{(9–7)}, 6–4
Win	14–2	Nov 2014	Geneva, Switzerland	Challenger	Hard	(Poland) Michał Przysiężny	6–1, 4–6, 6–3
Loss	14–3	Jan 2015	Happy Valley, Australia	Challenger	Hard	(United States) Ryan Harrison	6–7^{(8–10)}, 4–6
Win	15–3	Mar 2019	Shenzhen, China	Challenger	Hard	(Italy) Stefano Napolitano	6–2, 3–6, 6–4

=== Doubles: 1 (0–1) ===
Legend ATP Challenger Tour (0–0) ITF Futures Tour (0–1)	Finals by surface Hard (0–1) Clay (0–0) Grass (0–0) Carpet (0–0)

Result	W–L	Date	Tournament	Tier	Surface	Partner	Opponents	Score
Loss	0–1	May 2003	Uzbekistan F3, Andijan	Futures	Hard	(Switzerland) Stéphane Bohli	(South Africa) Justin Bower (Switzerland) Marco Chiudinelli	3–6, 6–7^{(3–7)}

== Performance timelines ==
Key
W	F	SF	QF	#R	RR	Q#	P#	DNQ	A	Z#	PO	G	S	B	NMS	NTI	P	NH

(W) winner; (F) finalist; (SF) semifinalist; (QF) quarterfinalist; (#R) rounds 4, 3, 2, 1; (RR) round-robin stage; (Q#) qualification round; (P#) preliminary round; (DNQ) did not qualify; (A) absent; (Z#) Davis/Fed Cup Zonal Group (with number indication) or (PO) play-off; (G) gold, (S) silver or (B) bronze Olympic/Paralympic medal; (NMS) not a Masters tournament; (NTI) not a Tier I tournament; (P) postponed; (NH) not held; (SR) strike rate (events won / competed); (W–L) win–loss record.

=== Singles ===
Tournament	2003	2004	2005	2006	2007	2008	2009	2010	2011	2012	2013	2014	2015	2016	2017	2018	2019	SR	W–L	Win %
Grand Slam tournaments
Australian Open	A	A	4R	F	2R	3R	4R	3R	3R	2R	3R	1R	3R	1R	2R	2R	Q1	0 / 14	26–14	65%
French Open	A	Q3	1R	2R	4R	1R	1R	3R	2R	2R	1R	A	2R	2R	1R	1R	A	0 / 13	10–13	43%
Wimbledon	A	Q1	1R	SF	QF	4R	A	1R	3R	3R	1R	2R	3R	1R	2R	2R	2R	0 / 14	22–14	61%
US Open	Q1	2R	1R	2R	1R	A	A	1R	1R	2R	3R	1R	1R	4R	1R	2R	A	0 / 13	9–13	41%
Win–loss	0–0	1–1	3–4	13–4	8–4	5–3	3–2	4–4	5–4	5–4	4–4	1–3	5–4	4–4	2–4	3–4	1–1	0 / 54	67–54	55.37%
Olympic Games
Summer Olympics	NH	2R	Not Held			A	Not Held			3R	Not Held			A	Not Held			0 / 2	3–2	60%
ATP World Tour Masters 1000
Indian Wells Masters	A	A	A	QF	2R	3R	A	4R	2R	3R	1R	A	2R	A	A	4R	A	0 / 9	12–8	60%
Miami Open	A	A	A	3R	2R	A	2R	3R	2R	2R	A	3R	1R	2R	A	1R	A	0 / 10	7–10	41%
Monte-Carlo Masters	A	A	A	A	1R	A	A	1R	1R	A	A	A	A	A	A	A	A	0 / 3	0–3	0%
Madrid Open	A	A	A	2R	2R	A	A	2R	2R	1R	1R	A	A	1R	1R	A	A	0 / 8	3–8	27%
Italian Open	A	A	A	2R	3R	A	A	1R	1R	1R	1R	A	A	A	A	A	A	0 / 6	3–6	33%
Canadian Open	A	A	A	1R	3R	A	A	1R	1R	2R	1R	A	A	A	A	A	A	0 / 6	3–6	33%
Cincinnati Masters	A	A	A	3R	3R	A	Q1	SF	1R	2R	1R	A	A	2R	A	Q2	A	0 / 7	10–7	59%
Shanghai Masters	Not Held						A	1R	A	3R	A	A	A	A	A	A	A	0 / 2	2–2	50%
Paris Masters	A	A	A	A	SF	1R	A	A	A	1R	A	A	A	2R	A	A	A	0 / 4	5–4	56%
German Open	A	A	A	1R	1R	A	Not Masters 1000 Series											0 / 2	0–2	0%
Win–loss	0–0	0–0	0–0	7–7	11–9	1–2	1–1	8–8	1–7	7–8	0–5	2–1	1–2	3–4	0–1	3–1	0–0	0 / 57	45–56	44.55%
Career statistics
	2003	2004	2005	2006	2007	2008	2009	2010	2011	2012	2013	2014	2015	2016	2017	2018	2019	Career		
Tournaments	0	2	12	21	23	12	17	28	27	25	22	11	19	23	16	17	3	278		
Titles	0	0	0	1	1	0	1	1	0	0	0	0	0	0	0	0	0	4		
Finals	0	0	1	2	3	0	1	3	1	0	0	0	1	1	1	0	0	14		
Overall win–loss	0–0	2–2	11–12	37–20	48–22	14–12	23–16	43–27	28–27	35–25	15–22	7–11	26–19	26–23	18–17	12–16	4–3	4 / 278	349–274	56%
Win %	N/A	50%	48%	65%	69%	54%	59%	61%	51%	58%	41%	39%	58%	53%	51%	43%	57%	56.02%		
Year-end ranking	197	159	55	12	16	98	42	20	44	36	87	85	46	36	102	125	179	56.02%		

=== Doubles ===
Tournament	2006	2007	2008	2009	2010	2011	2012	2013	2014	2015	2016	2017	2018	2019	SR	W–L
Grand Slam tournaments
Australian Open	1R	2R	A	A	A	A	A	3R	A	1R	A	2R	A	A	0 / 5	4–5
French Open	A	A	A	A	A	A	A	A	A	A	1R	A	A	A	0 / 1	0–1
Wimbledon	A	1R	A	A	A	A	A	A	A	A	1R	1R	A	A	0 / 3	0–3
US Open	A	A	A	A	A	A	A	A	A	A	2R	A	1R	A	0 / 2	1–2
Win–loss	0–1	1–2	0–0	0–0	0–0	0–0	0–0	2–1	0–0	0–1	1–3	1–2	0–1	0–0	0 / 11	5–11

== Wins over top 10 players ==
- He has a 22–53 (.293) record against players who were, at the time the match was played, ranked in the top 10.

Season	2003	2004	2005	2006	2007	2008	2009	2010	2011	2012	2013	2014	2015	2016	2017	2018	2019	Total
Wins	0	0	2	5	4	1	0	4	1	1	1	0	1	1	0	1	0	22

#	Player	Rank	Event	Surface	Rd	Score
2005
1.	(Argentina) Mariano Puerta	No. 10	Tokyo, Japan	Hard	3R	6–2, 6–7^{(11–13)}, 7–5
2.	(Argentina) David Nalbandian	No. 10	Basel, Switzerland	Hard	SF	6–2, 7–6^{(7–3)}
2006
3.	(United States) Andy Roddick	No. 3	Australian Open, Melbourne	Hard	4R	6–4, 1–6, 6–3, 6–4
4.	(Croatia) Ivan Ljubičić	No. 8	Australian Open, Melbourne	Hard	QF	6–4, 6–2, 4–6, 3–6, 6–3
5.	(Argentina) David Nalbandian	No. 4	Australian Open, Melbourne	Hard	SF	3–6, 5–7, 6–3, 6–4, 6–4
6.	(Argentina) Gastón Gaudio	No. 8	Indian Wells, USA	Hard	3R	6–7^{(5–7)}, 6–3, 6–2
7.	(Australia) Lleyton Hewitt	No. 9	Wimbledon, England	Grass	QF	6–1, 5–7, 7–6^{(7–5)}, 6–2
2007
8.	(Croatia) Ivan Ljubičić	No. 8	Zagreb, Croatia	Hard	F	7–6^{(7–4)}, 4–6, 6–4
9.	(Russia) Nikolay Davydenko	No. 4	Wimbledon, England	Grass	4R	7–6^{(7–5)}, 7–6^{(7–5)}, 6–3
10.	(Russia) Nikolay Davydenko	No. 4	Paris, France	Hard	3R	6–2, 6–2
11.	(Spain) Tommy Robredo	No. 8	Paris, France	Hard	QF	6–4, 6–4
2008
12.	(Russia) Mikhail Youzhny	No. 8	Marseille, France	Hard	QF	7–6^{(7–2)}, 6–3
2010
13.	(Switzerland) Roger Federer	No. 1	Indian Wells, USA	Hard	3R	5–7, 7–5, 7–6^{(7–4)}
14.	(Spain) Fernando Verdasco	No. 10	Washington, USA	Hard	QF	7–6^{(7–3)}, 6–4
15.	(Czech Republic) Tomáš Berdych	No. 7	Cincinnati, USA	Hard	3R	7–5, 6–4
16.	(Spain) Rafael Nadal	No. 1	Cincinnati, USA	Hard	QF	6–4, 4–6, 6–4
2011
17.	(United Kingdom) Andy Murray	No. 5	Rotterdam, Netherlands	Hard	1R	6–4, 6–1
2012
18.	(Argentina) Juan Mónaco	No. 10	Tokyo, Japan	Hard	2R	7–5, 1–6, 6–3
2013
19.	(France) Richard Gasquet	No. 10	Rotterdam, Netherlands	Hard	2R	6–4, 6–4
2015
20.	(Spain) David Ferrer	No. 7	Nottingham, UK	Grass	2R	6–2, 7–6^{(7–4)}
2016
21.	(Czech Republic) Tomáš Berdych	No. 8	Halle, Germany	Grass	1R	7–6^{(7–3)}, 7–6^{(7–4)}
2018
22.	(Austria) Dominic Thiem	No. 7	Wimbledon, England	Grass	1R	6–4, 7–5, 2–0 ret.

Olympic Games
Preceded by George Achilleos	Flagbearer for Cyprus; London 2012	Succeeded by Pavlos Kontides
