= 2015 Champions Tennis League =

- League: Champions Tennis League
- Sport: Team tennis
- Duration: 23 November – 6 December 2015
- Teams: 6
- League champions: Punjab Marshalls
- Runners-up: Hyderabad Aces
- Season MVP: Martina Hingis

CTL seasons
- ← 2014

The 2015 Champions Tennis League was the second edition of the Champions Tennis League.

== Format ==
The 2015 edition of CTL was announced by Vijay Amritraj on 23 September 2015, at a press conference in Mumbai. The press conference also saw the draft of the players into each team. In 2015, CTL featured six city based teams across India and saw 13 matches played over a 2-week period between 23 November and 6 December. The winners' prize money was Rs. 1 crore, while the runner-up prize was Rs. 50 lakhs.

Each tie will consist of 5 sets with each set being considered as a match. Unlike the 2014 edition, the winner of a match was the player/doubles team that wins 5 games, not 6. The winner of the tie was the team that wins the highest number of games across all 5 sets.

== Teams ==
CTL 2015 teams
Team	Location	Stadium
Mumbai Tennis Masters	Mumbai, Maharashtra	MSLTA Stadium
Hyderabad Aces	Hyderabad, Telangana	Fateh Maidan
V Chennai Warriors	Chennai, Tamil Nadu	SDAT Tennis Stadium
Nagpur Orangers	Nagpur, Maharashtra	Nagpur District Hard Court Tennis Association
Raipur Rangers	Raipur, Chhattisgarh	Balbir Singh Juneja Indoor Stadium
Punjab Marshalls	Chandigarh	CLTA Tennis Stadium

== Players ==
Zone A

Mumbai Tennis Masters

Player
(Netherlands) Richard Krajicek
(Colombia) Santiago Giraldo
(Italy) Flavia Pennetta
(India) Sriram Balaji

Zone B

Nagpur Orangers

Player
(Spain) Àlex Corretja
(Spain) Feliciano López
(Serbia) Jelena Janković
(India) Divij Sharan

Raipur Rangers

Player
(Austria) Thomas Muster
(Spain) Roberto Bautista Agut
(France) Alizé Cornet
(India) Ramkumar Ramanathan

Hyderabad Aces

Player
(Sweden) Thomas Johansson
(Croatia) Ivo Karlović
(Switzerland) Martina Hingis
(India) Jeevan Nedunchezhiyan

Punjab Marshalls

Player
(United Kingdom) Greg Rusedski
(Cyprus) Marcos Baghdatis
(Ukraine) Elina Svitolina
(India) Saketh Myneni

V Chennai Warriors

Player
(Germany) Rainer Schüttler
(Spain) Fernando Verdasco
(United Kingdom) Heather Watson
(India) Vishnu Vardhan

== Group round ==
=== Matches ===
Date	Zone	Fixture	Score	Venue
23 November	A	Mumbai Tennis Masters v Punjab Marshalls	19–21	MSLTA Stadium, Mumbai, Maharashtra
24 November	A	Mumbai Tennis Masters v Raipur Rangers	14–23	MSLTA Stadium, Mumbai, Maharashtra
25 November	B	V Chennai Warriors v Hyderabad Aces	16–25	SDAT Tennis Stadium, Chennai, Tamil Nadu
26 November	B	V Chennai Warriors v Nagpur Orangers	23–24	SDAT Tennis Stadium, Chennai, Tamil Nadu
27 November	A	Punjab Marshalls v Raipur Rangers	23–15	CLTA Tennis Stadium, Chandigarh
28 November	A	Punjab Marshalls v Mumbai Tennis Masters	24–13	CLTA Tennis Stadium, Chandigarh
29 November	B	Hyderabad Aces v Nagpur Orangers	20–22	Fateh Maidan, Hyderabad, Telangana
30 November	B	Hyderabad Aces v V Chennai Warriors	25–19	Fateh Maidan, Hyderabad, Telangana
1 December	A	Raipur Rangers v Mumbai Tennis Masters	25–16	Balbir Singh Juneja Indoor Stadium, Raipur
2 December	A	Raipur Rangers v Punjab Marshalls	18–20	Balbir Singh Juneja Indoor Stadium, Raipur
3 December	B	Nagpur Orangers v V Chennai Warriors	18–22	Nagpur District Hard Court Tennis Association, Nagpur
4 December	B	Nagpur Orangers v Hyderabad Aces	21–23	Nagpur District Hard Court Tennis Association, Nagpur

=== Standings ===
Zone A

Pos.	Team	MP	W	L	GW	GL	GW	GL	Pts
1	Punjab Marshalls	4	4	0	13	6	88	65	8
2	Raipur Rangers	4	2	2	13	7	81	72	4
3	Mumbai Tennis Masters	4	0	4	4	16	61	93	0

Zone B

Pos.	Team	MP	W	L	GW	GL	GW	GL	Pts
1	Hyderabad Aces	4	3	1	14	6	93	78	6
2	Nagpur Orangers	4	2	2	11	9	85	88	4
3	V Chennai Warriors	4	1	3	5	15	80	92	2

== Final ==
Date	Fixture	Score	Venue
6 December	Punjab Marshalls v Hyderabad Aces	22–21	Fateh Maidan, Hyderabad, Telangana

== Broadcasting rights ==
In India, all Champions Tennis League matches broadcast live on Sony SIX HD and Sony SIX who has the exclusive broadcasting rights for the event in the Indian subcontinent.
