= 2014 Champions Tennis League =

- League: Champions Tennis League
- Sport: Team tennis
- Duration: 17 November – 26 November 2015
- Number of teams: 6
- League champions: Pune Marathas
- Runners-up: Delhi Dreams
- Season MVP: Marcos Baghdatis

CTL seasons
- 2015 →

The 2014 Champions Tennis League was the first edition of the Champions Tennis League.

== Format ==
In 2014, the CTL saw 13 matches played over a 10-day period between 17 and 26 November 2014. Each tie consisted of 5 sets, with each considered as a match. The winner of a match was the player/doubles team that won 6 games. The winner of the tie was the team that won the highest number of games across all 5 sets. The winners' prize money was Rs. 1 crore, while the runner-up prize was Rs. 50 lakhs.

== Teams ==
CTL teams
| Team | Location | Stadium |
|---|---|---|
| Mumbai Tennis Masters | Mumbai, Maharashtra | Kalina Stadium |
| Hyderabad Aces | Hyderabad, Telangana | Fateh Maidan |
| Bangalore Raptors | Bengaluru, Karnataka | KSLTA Tennis Stadium |
| Pune Marathas | Pune, Maharashtra | Shree Shiv Chhatrapati Sports Complex |
| Delhi Dreams | Delhi | R.K. Khanna Tennis Complex |
| Punjab Marshalls | Chandigarh | CLTA Tennis Stadium |

== Players ==
Mumbai Tennis Masters

Player
(Spain) Sergi Bruguera
(Spain) Tommy Robredo
(France) Alizé Cornet
(India) Sriram Balaji

Delhi Dreams

Player
(Spain) Juan Carlos Ferrero
(South Africa) Kevin Anderson
(Serbia) Jelena Janković
(India) Sanam Singh

Pune Marathas

Player
(Australia) Pat Cash
(Cyprus) Marcos Baghdatis
(Poland) Agnieszka Radwańska
(India) Saketh Myneni

Bangalore Raptors

Player
(Sweden) Thomas Enqvist
(Spain) Feliciano López
(United States) Venus Williams
(India) Ramkumar Ramanathan

Hyderabad Aces

Player
(Australia) Mark Philippoussis
(Russia) Mikhail Youzhny
(Switzerland) Martina Hingis
(India) Jeevan Nedunchezhiyan

Punjab Marshalls

Player
(United Kingdom) Greg Rusedski
(India) Somdev Devvarman
(Spain) Garbiñe Muguruza
(India) Leander Paes

== Group round ==
=== Matches ===
| Date | Zone | Fixture | Score | Venue |
|---|---|---|---|---|
| 17 November | North | Delhi Dreams v Punjab Marshalls | 25–19 | Delhi |
| 17 November | South | Hyderabad Aces v Bangalore Raptors | 27–25 | Hyderabad |
| 18 November | South | Hyderabad Aces v Pune Marathas | 25–26 | Hyderabad |
| 18 November | North | Delhi Dreams v Mumbai Tennis Masters | 27–19 | Delhi |
| 20 November | South | Bangalore Raptors v Pune Marathas | 24–25 | Bangalore |
| 20 November | North | Punjab Marshalls v Mumbai Tennis Masters | 21–27 | Chandigarh |
| 21 November | North | Punjab Marshalls v Delhi Dreams | 29–18 | Chandigarh |
| 21 November | South | Bangalore Raptors v Hyderabad Aces | 22–25 | Bangalore |
| 23 November | South | Pune Marathas v Bangalore Raptors | 26–20 | Pune |
| 23 November | North | Mumbai Tennis Masters v Delhi Dreams | 21–27 | Mumbai |
| 24 November | North | Mumbai Tennis Masters v Punjab Marshalls | 29–20 | Mumbai |
| 24 November | South | Pune Marathas v Hyderabad Aces | 25–24 | Pune |

=== Standings ===
- North Zone: Delhi – 3 points, Mumbai – 2 points, Punjab – 1 point.
- South Zone: Pune – 4 points, Hyderabad – 2 points, Bangalore – 0 points.

== Final ==
| Date | Fixture | Score | Venue |
|---|---|---|---|
| 26 November | Pune Marathas v Delhi Dreams | 27–23 | Delhi |
