= V Chennai Warriors =

Tennis team

- Nickname: NO
- Founded: 2015
- League: CTL
- Based in: Chennai, Tamil Nadu
- Stadium: SDAT Tennis Stadium, Chennai
- Owner: Prabhu Deva and Ishari K Ganesh

V Chennai Warriors is a tennis team representing the Indian city of Chennai in the Champions Tennis League. The team was initially supposed to take part in the 2014 Champions Tennis League but due to unavoidable circumstances they backed out at the last moment and eventually the Hyderabad Aces went on to replace them in the 2014 edition. On 14 November 2015, the V Chennai Warriors franchise was unveiled by Vijay Amritraj, founder of the Champions Tennis League. The team is owned by Prabhu Deva, an actor and Ishari K Ganesh, founder Chairman and Chancellor of the Vels University in Chennai. The players who represented this team in the 2015 season were Rainer Schuettler, Fernando Verdasco, Heather Watson and Vishnu Vardhan. The 2015 tournament began on 23 November and ended on 6 December with the V Chennai Warriors finishing last in Group B with one win and three losses from four games. Group B also had the likes of Hyderabad Aces and Nagpur Orangers.

== Home Stadium ==
The home stadium of the V Chennai Warriors is the SDAT Tennis Stadium in Nungambakkam, Chennai. This historical stadium is also the venue of India's lone ATP World Tour event, the Chennai Open.

Tamil Nadu
Chennai
SDAT Tennis Stadium
Capacity: 5,800
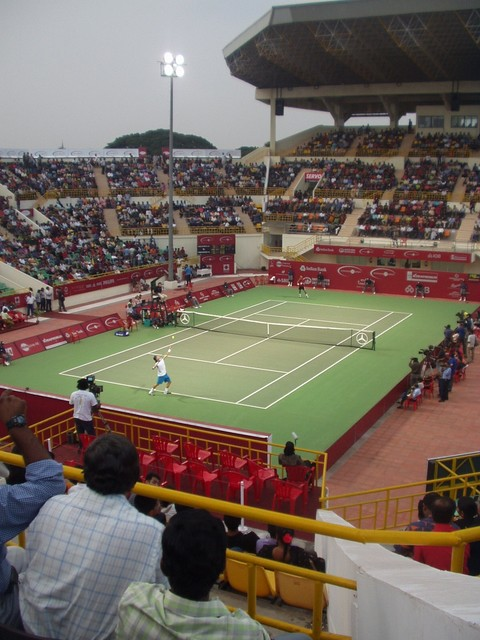

== Players ==
=== 2015 season ===
Player
(Germany) Rainer Schuettler
(Spain) Fernando Verdasco
(United Kingdom) Heather Watson
(India) Vishnu Vardhan
