= Rapture (disambiguation) =

The rapture is a predicted event in certain systems of Christian eschatology.

Rapture or The Rapture may also refer to:

- Rapture (Buddhism), a common translation of piti, a factor of meditative absorption
- The emotion of ecstasy

== Film ==
- Rapture (1950 film), an Italian romantic drama
- The Rapture (1954 film), a Mexican drama
- Rapture (1965 film), starring Dean Stockwell
- The Rapture (1991 film), starring Mimi Rogers
- The Rapture (2023 film), a French drama
- Rapture (2023 film), directed by Dominic Sangma

== Television ==
- Rapture (TV series), a 2018 American docu-series
- "Rapture" (Battlestar Galactica), a 2007 TV episode
- "Rapture" (Star Trek: Deep Space Nine), a 1996 TV episode
- "The Rapture" (Supernatural), a 2009 TV episode
- Rapture TV, a UK television station
- The Rapture (TV series), a 2026 British television series

== Literature ==
- Rapture (Sosnowski novel), 1996
- Rapture, a 2002 novel by Susan Minot
- The Rapture, a 2009 novel by Liz Jensen
- The Rapture (novel), a book in the Left Behind series written by Tim LaHaye and Jerry B. Jenkins
- The Rapture (audio drama), based on the British science fiction television series Doctor Who
- Rapture (Kate novel), a novel in the Fallen series by American author Lauren Kate
- Rapture (poetry collection), a collection of poetry by Carol Ann Duffy

== Music ==
=== Bands ===
- The Rapture (band), a rock band based in New York City
- Rapture (Finnish band), a doom metal band
- Rapture (hardcore band), a Christian punk band from San Francisco, California

=== Albums ===
- Rapture (Anita Baker album), 1986
- Rapture (Betraying the Martyrs album), 2019
- Rapture (Bradley Joseph album), 1997
- Rapture (Dragonlord album), 2001
- Rapture (Impaled Nazarene album), 1998
- Rapture (EP), by Koffee, 2019
- Rapture (The Mavis's album), 2001
- Rapture (Johnny Mathis album), 1962
- Rapture (Trio X album), 1999
- Rapture (Peter Mulvey album), 1995
- Rapture, a 2012 album by Romeo's Daughter
- The Rapture (album), by Siouxsie and the Banshees, 1995

=== Songs and instrumental works ===
- "Rapture" (Blondie song), 1981
- "Rapture" (iiO song), 2001
- "Rapture" (Hurt song), 2006
- "Rapture" (Morbid Angel song), 1993
- Rapture (composition), a 2000 orchestral composition by Christopher Rouse
- Rapture, a 2001 composition by Michael Torke
- "Rapture", a song by Deftones from the 2006 album Saturday Night Wrist
- "Rapture", a song by Laura Veirs from the 2004 album Carbon Glacier
- "Rapture", the opening theme of anime series Zodiac War by Panama Panorama Town
- "The Rapture", a song by Senses Fail from the 2006 album Still Searching
- "The Rapture", a song by Puscifer from the 2011 album Conditions of My Parole

== Video games ==
- Rapture (video game), a codename for Square Enix's MMORPG video game Final Fantasy XIV
- Rapture (BioShock), a fictitious underwater city
- Rapture (engine), core software created for Iron Realms Entertainment multiuser video games

== Other uses ==
- Rapture, Indiana, an unincorporated community in Posey County, Indiana, United States
- Rapture (character), a character from Image Comics

== See also ==
- Rapt (disambiguation)
- Raptor (disambiguation)
- Raptus (disambiguation)
- Rupture (disambiguation)
