= Pune Marathas =

Pune Marathas may refer to:

- Pune Marathas (American football), an American football team based in Pune, India
- Pune Marathas (tennis), a tennis team representing Pune, India
