= Raptor (comics) =

Raptor, in comics, may refer to:

- Raptor (Marvel Comics), three different characters
- Raptor (DC Comics), five different characters
- Raptor (G.I. Joe), a falconer for Cobra
- Raptor, a very aggressive member of XTNCT

== See also ==
- Raptor (disambiguation)
