= Grover Shoe Factory disaster =

Industrial explosion in Brockton, Massachusetts on March 20, 1905

Coordinates: 42°03′59″N 71°01′00″W

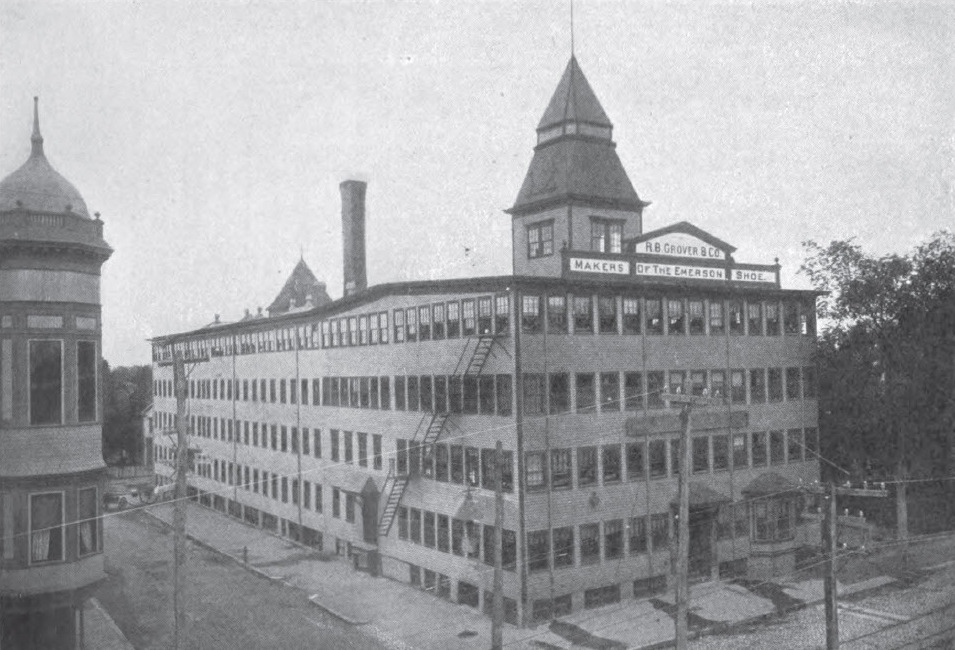
R.B. Grover Shoe factory before explosion

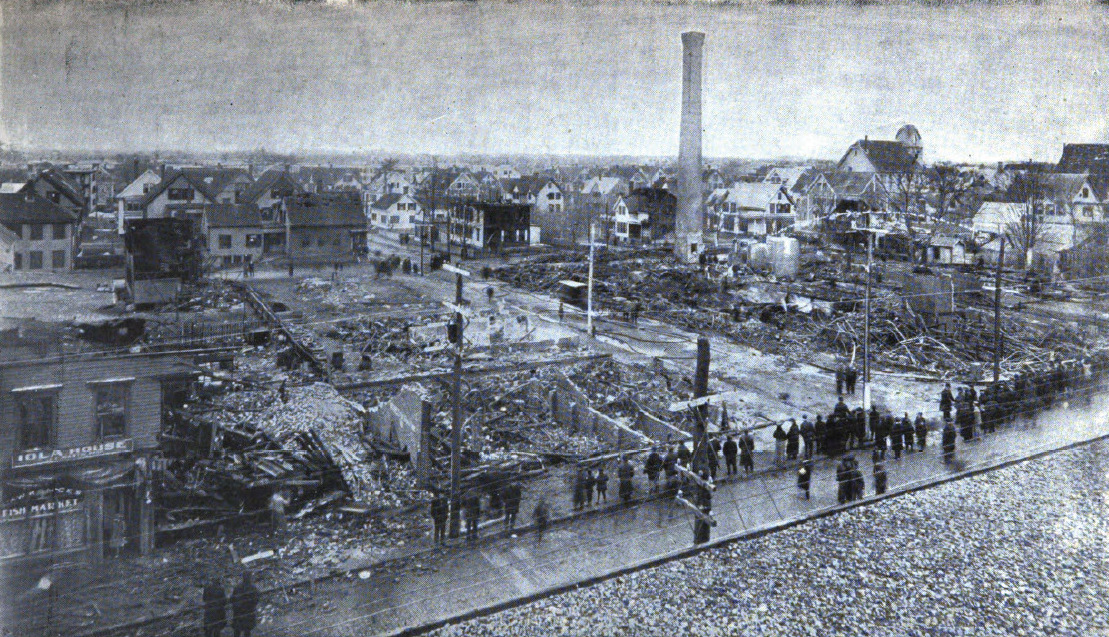
View of disaster, March 1905. The arrows (curved white arc toward right) show the trajectory of the boiler.

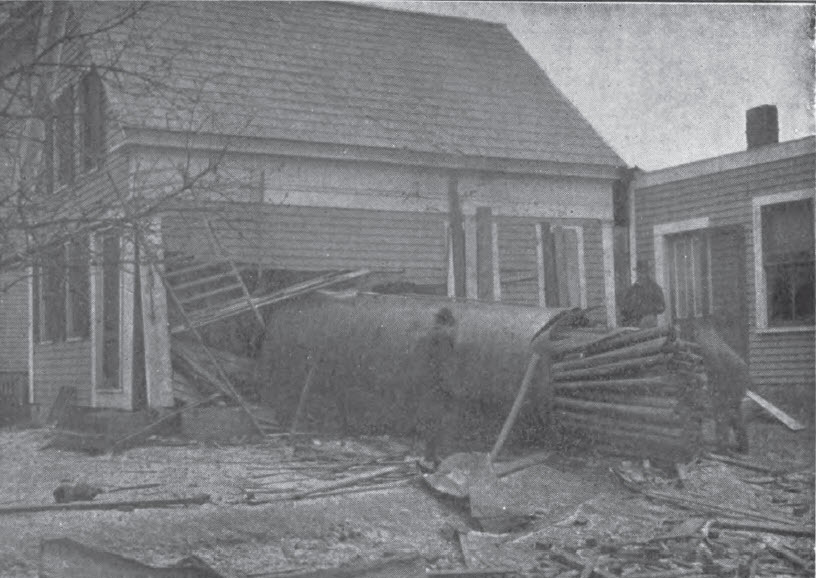
View of boiler lodged in the home of Miss Mary Pratt

The Grover Shoe Factory disaster was an industrial explosion, building collapse and fire that killed 58 people and injured 150 when it leveled the R. B. Grover shoe factory in Brockton, Massachusetts on March 20, 1905. Following a boiler explosion, the four-story wooden building collapsed and the ruins burst into flames, incinerating workers trapped in the wreckage.

The Grover disaster brought new attention to industrial safety and led to stringent safety laws and a national code governing the safe operation of steam boilers.

== The factory ==
The R. B. Grover shoe factory was one of a number of shoe factories in Brockton, a town that had 35,000 shoe workers. The wooden building, shaped like a letter E, occupied half a city block at the corner of Main and Calmar Streets. Grover made the popular Emerson brand shoe, and business had been good enough to add a fourth floor.

The factory was heated using steam radiators, with the steam being produced by coal-fired steel boilers installed in a brick boiler house attached to the wooden factory as the crossbar of the E. When the fourth floor was added, the original boiler was replaced by a larger one and the old boiler, 17 feet (5.2 m) long and six feet (1.8 m) in diameter, was left in place as a backup. Since the new boiler could generally meet the factory's demands on its own, the old one was seldom used; and when used, was done so reluctantly. Grover's chief engineer David Rockwell, who had a first-class engineer's license and twelve years experience, did not trust it.

== Explosion ==
The new boiler had to be flushed out as part of its regular maintenance, so Rockwell had put the old boiler back into service temporarily. Early that cold damp Monday, he fed its coal fire and put the boiler to work heating the building for arriving day-shift workers. At 7:45 a.m. the plant manager telephoned Rockwell to ask about some strange noises coming from the radiators along one wall. Rockwell had just stepped out of the building, but his assistant assured the manager that everything was in order.

A few minutes later, the old boiler exploded, rocketing up through three floors and the roof.

== Collapse and fire ==
The flying boiler knocked over an elevated water tower at one end of the building and its full tank smashed through the roof, causing that end of the building to immediately collapse, with the floors pancaking and the walls falling in on top of them.

Many workers who survived the initial explosion and collapse were trapped by broken beams and heavy machinery. Burning coals thrown from the boiler's fire pit landed throughout the debris, starting fires that were fed by broken gas lines. The factory's more than 300 windows, now blown out, created a chimney effect in the parts of the factory still standing, resulting in a fire hot enough to melt iron pipes and radiators. The wooden floors, treated nightly with linseed oil to keep the dust down, burned quickly. High winds helped spread the fire to nearby storage sheds and neighboring buildings including a hardware store and a rooming house.

The Campello neighborhood's district firehouse shared a city block with the factory and its firefighters arrived quickly, as did many local citizens. Using long timbers as levers, they were able to lift some of the wreckage and rescue some workers before the flames reached them. Local newspapers recount many acts of heroism in the rescues made that day.

Barrels of naphtha, a volatile industrial solvent related to gasoline, were stored in a wooden shed directly behind the boiler house. The shed was set afire by the burning coals and the naphtha exploded, throwing sheets of flame onto the wreckage and driving rescuers away.

=== Escape ===
Between 300 and 400 workers were in the factory at the time of the explosion. Workers in the sections that were still standing escaped down stairways or climbed to the roof; others had to jump from windows because the explosion had knocked some fire escapes off the building.

About 100 workers escaped unharmed and 150 were injured. A number who were only slightly injured went home without reporting their injuries. Police later relayed the story of a worker so dazed that he left the scene, applied for a job at another shoe factory, worked all day, then went home to find his family mourning him.

=== Death ===
An immediate search was made for the chief engineer. Rockwell was at first reported as among the injured, then could not be found, then at one point was reported as having left town. From her kitchen window, Mrs. Rockwell had seen him sitting in a chair near the boiler house window five minutes before the explosion. A search of the boiler house the next day turned up a charred body, a bent watch, two rubber heels and a torn piece of clothing identified by Mrs. Rockwell as belonging to her husband.

Survivors were asked to register their names with the police. Body collection began that afternoon, with only bone fragments to be found toward the rear of the factory where the fire was worst. As families arrived looking for missing workers, grief-stricken relatives ran back and forth between reading the latest survivor lists and watching the recovery of bodies.

Due to the extreme heat of the fire, only a few bodies could be positively identified. Thirty-nine unidentified victims were buried in a ceremony at Brockton's Melrose Cemetery three days later. The disaster's 58th victim, Hiram Pierce, died on April 15.

== Financial assistance ==
On the day of the fire, the leatherworkers union announced that the injured would be paid $5 weekly (equivalent to $179 in 2025) until they recovered, and that the families of the dead would receive $100 (equivalent to $3,583 in 2025) for each family member killed. Civic leaders created the Brockton Relief Fund, which collected and distributed nearly $105,000 in cash assistance to the families (equivalent to $3,762,500 in 2025). Factory owner Robbins Grover worked for the rest of his life to secure financial aid for the families of those who died.

== Failure theories ==
An assistant engineer who had been with Rockwell five minutes before the explosion stated that when he left, the boiler gauges showed steam pressure to be in the safe range and the boiler to have plenty of water. The state Inspector of Boilers checked the boiler's fusible plug and determined that the explosion was not caused by a lack of water.

Rockwell's wife stated that for the past few days her husband had been irritable because he had to operate the boiler at "a pressure it was unequal to". A factory official stated that he was "at a loss" to account for the explosion, and when told of Mrs. Rockwell's remarks said that the amount of pressure on the boiler was not a matter in which factory officials interfered, adding that the engineer "took his orders in this matter from the Hartford Boiler Insurance Company, and if he overworked that boiler he did it without our knowledge. We do not even know why he used the old boiler this week instead of the newer one".

(The Hartford Steam Boiler Inspection and Insurance Company provided regular inspection and testing to customers of its insurance program, as well as on-site engineering services, resulting in something of a shared responsibility with boiler owners for safe operation.)

One Grover executive speculated that the explosion might have been caused by a recently installed safety device. C. E. Roberts, a manager of Hartford Steam Boiler, stated "So far as I have been able to learn there appears to have been no carelessness in the handling of the boiler, and the explosion, in my opinion, was caused by a defect that was impossible to discover."

== Inquest ==
A coroner's inquest was convened. A Grover representative testified that the boiler was inspected in December and found in apparent good condition. Several employees testified that David Rockwell "seemed capable of attending to his duties" that morning. Boiler inspectors who examined the ripped-open boiler reported finding a crack in one of its riveted, lap jointed seams. Experts characterized the boiler, built in 1890, as old technology likely to have a short service life under high pressure. Thousands of similar boilers were then in use in the United States.

On March 29 the district attorney stated that the accident was due to a hidden defect in the boiler and that no criminal charges would be filed. As to civil liability, two weeks later a judge ruled that the explosion was caused by a defect that could not have been discovered, and held the company blameless. He also found that the various insinuations made against chief engineer Rockwell were untrue.

=== Engineering study ===
An engineering study begun as part of the inquest brought new facts to light. At least two barrels of naphtha were stored in a wooden shed directly behind the boiler house. The study said that without the naphtha explosions the number of deaths would have been only about one-quarter of the actual. When the naphtha exploded, it crushed one side of the factory building, pinning more workers under beams and machinery. A second outbuilding containing naphtha caught fire after about fifteen minutes and there was a second naphtha explosion, showering hundreds of gallons of the flaming liquid on the burning wreckage.

Engineers estimated the force of the boiler explosion as equal to 660 pounds (300 kg) of dynamite.

== Bankruptcy ==
Although his factory was insured, Captain Grover was financially ruined. The R. B. Grover Company declared bankruptcy and assigned its remaining assets, more than 30 Emerson shoe stores scattered around the country, to its creditors.

== Legacy ==
The American Society of Mechanical Engineers (ASME) had been founded in 1880 in response to the boiler explosions that had become common as the use of steam power expanded during the Industrial Revolution. Between 1880 and 1890 there were over 2000 boiler explosions in the United States. By 1890, some 100,000 boilers were in service, many of them unsafe. Inspections were rare, and operating guidelines almost nonexistent. Steam pressures were regularly cranked up to produce additional work.

The Grover disaster, coupled with another fatal Massachusetts shoe factory boiler explosion the following year in Lynn, brought new cries for improved industrial safety. A new governor demanded prompt action and a Board of Boiler Rules was formed, drafting a simple three-page set of rules. After the ASME helped overcome manufacturer objections to "needless government interference", Massachusetts passed "An Act Relating to the Operation and Inspection of Steam Boilers" in 1907. The Massachusetts laws eventually led to passage of a national boiler safety code.

Safety improved, but the Massachusetts fatalities would not be the last. Twenty-three people were killed and 94 injured in 1962 when a boiler exploded and ripped through a New York Telephone Company cafeteria at lunchtime. A city agency later determined that the boiler had been improperly maintained and operated.

== See also ==
- Boiler insurance
- Fire-tube boiler
- List of disasters in Massachusetts by death toll
- List of industrial disasters
- Pemberton Mill
- Triangle Shirtwaist Factory fire
- Sultana steamboat explosion
