= Velociraptor (disambiguation) =

Velociraptor is a genus of small dromaeosaurid theropod dinosaur and cousin of Deinonychus.

Velociraptor may also refer to:

- Velociraptor!, an album by English rock band Kasabian
- VelociRaptor, a series of high-performance hard disk drives
- Australian band, featuring Jeremy Neale.
- Rollercoaster at Paultons Park, England.
- Velociraptor (software), a Digital Forensics and Incident Response (DFIR) Tool

== See also ==
- Raptor (disambiguation)
