= Rapt =

Rapt or RAPT may refer to:

== Acronyms ==
- Rehabilitation for Addicted Prisoners Trust (RAPt), a charity which helps people with drug and alcohol dependence move towards, achieve and maintain drug and crime-free lives
- Reverse Address and Port Translation, a variation of Network Address Translation in computing
- Retractable Amphibious Pontoon Technology, a retractable pontoon system for the float plane industry being developed by Tigerfish Aviation
- RAPT1 or mTOR, the mammalian target of rapamycin protein
- RATP Group (Régie Autonome des Transports Parisiens), a public transport company based in Paris, France

== Films ==
- Rapt (film), a 2009 French dramatic film directed by Lucas Belvaux
- Rapt: la séparation des races, a 1934 film directed by Dimitri Kirsanoff

== Other uses ==
- "Rapt. Dept.", a 2005 single/EP from Yourcodenameis:milo
- Rapt or Raptus, a king of the Hasdingi Vandals

== See also ==
- Raptio, Latin term referring to the large scale abduction of women
- Raptor (disambiguation)
- Rapture (disambiguation)
- Raptus (disambiguation)
