= David Sosnowski =

American novelist and short story writer (born 1959)

David Sosnowski (born 1959 in Taylor, Michigan) is an American novelist and short story writer. He has worked as a gag writer, fireworks salesman, telephone pollster, university writing instructor, and environmental-protection specialist while living in places as different as Washington, DC; Detroit, Michigan; and Fairbanks, Alaska. In a novelistic twist, David lives in a Michigan home previously owned by the sixth-grade English teacher who inspired him to write. A winner of the Thomas Wolfe Fiction Prize, David's short fiction has appeared in numerous magazines, including Passages North, River City, and Alaska Quarterly Review. He has published three books, Rapture, Vamped and Happy Doomsday.
