= Rupture =

Rupture may refer to:

== General ==
- Rupture (engineering), a failure of tough ductile materials loaded in tension

== Anatomy and medicine ==
- Abdominal hernia, formerly referred to as "a rupture"
- Achilles tendon rupture
- Rupture of membranes, a "water breaking" event of pregnancy
  - Premature rupture of membranes, when the amniotic sac ruptures more than an hour before the onset of labor
- Ruptured spleen
- Testicular rupture, a rip or tear in the connective tissue covering of the testes
- Breast implant#Implant rupture, a rupture of breast implants

== Other uses ==
- Steam rupture, a rupture in a pressurized system of super critical water
- Rupture (social networking), a social networking site for computer gamers
- Earthquake rupture, an event that generates seismic energy as a result of slip on a fault
- "Rupture" (The Flash episode), an episode in season two of The Flash
- Rupture (1983 film), a Soviet drama film
- Rupture (2016 film), a science fiction film by Steven Shainberg
- Rupture (2017 film), a Canadian short drama film
- DJ /rupture, a New York-based DJ and producer
- Rupture (band), an Australian hardcore punk band
- Rupture (DC Comics), a DC Comics character
