= Balbir Singh Juneja Indoor Stadium =

Indoor stadium in Raipur, Chhattisgarh, India

- Indoor Stadium
- Interactive map of Balbir Singh Juneja Indoor Stadium
- Full name: Balbir Singh Juneja Indoor Stadium
- Location: Raipur, Chhattisgarh
- Coordinates: 21.235°N 81.630°E
- Owner: Raipur Municipal Corporation
- Operator: Chhattisgarh Olympic Association
- Capacity: 4,000

Construction
- Groundbreaking: n/a
- Opened: n/a

Website
- Chhattisgarh Olympic Association

Balbir Singh Juneja Indoor Stadium is an Indoor stadium in Raipur, Chhattisgarh. The stadium is only indoor stadium in city and was named after Balbir Singh Juneja who was born in the city with capacity of 4,000. It is owned and managed by Raipur Municipal Corporation.The stadium has facilities for games like basketball, volleyball, tennis, squash, table-tennis, badminton, and gymnastics. The stadium is home for Chhattisgarh's first professional sports team called Raipur Rangers which plays in Champions Tennis League.
