= Paramytha =

Paramytha Παραμύθα
- Village
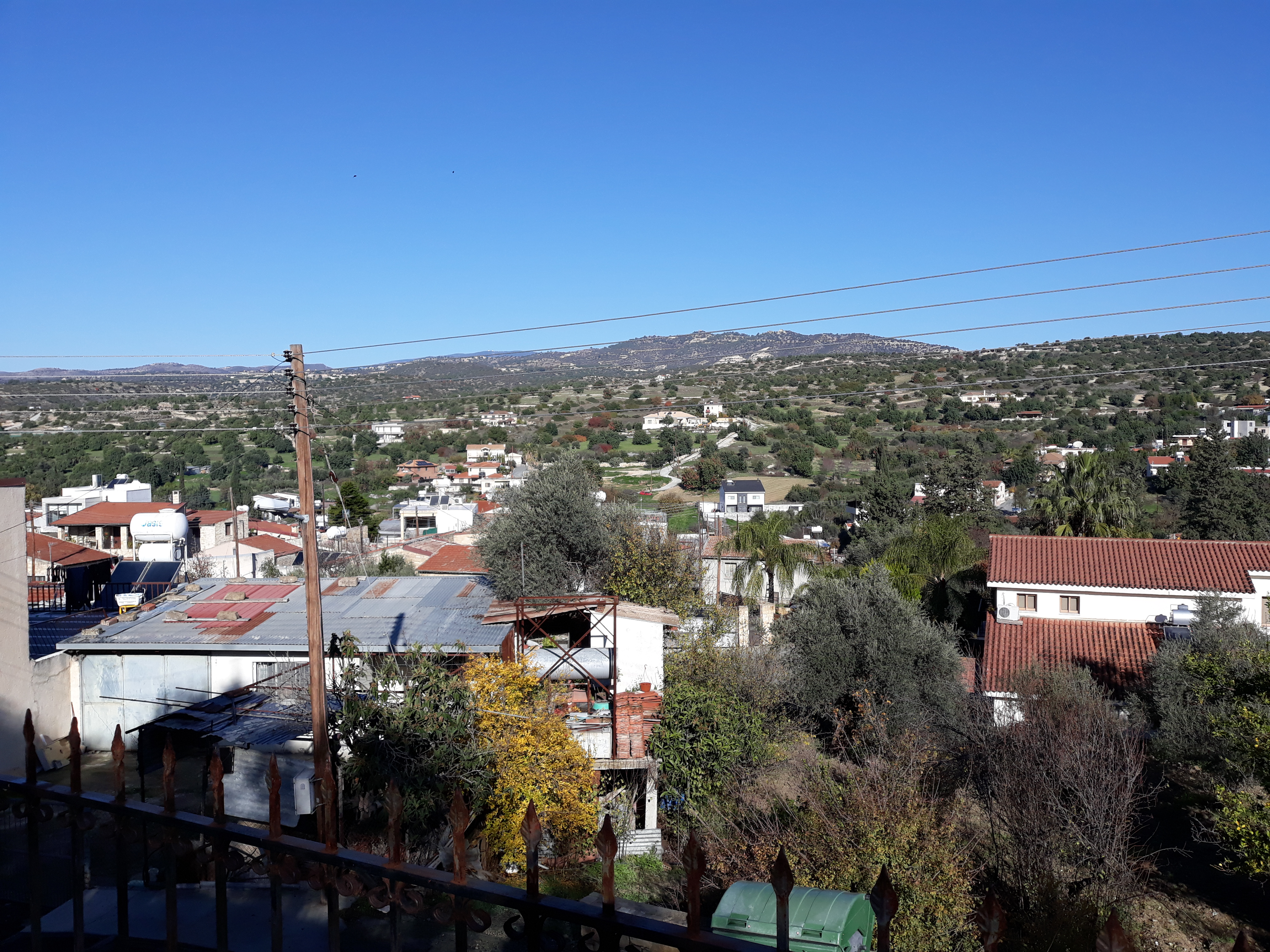

- Location in Cyprus
- Coordinates: 34°45′37″N 32°59′41″E
- Country: Cyprus
- District: Limassol District

Population (2011)
  - Total: 569
- Time zone: UTC+2 (EET)
  - Summer (DST): UTC+3 (EEST)
- Postal code: 4540

Paramytha (Greek: Παραμύθα) is a village located north of Limassol on the foothills of the Troodos mountains. Former world No.8 ranked tennis player Marcos Baghdatis was born in this village.
