= SDAT Tennis Stadium =

Stadium in Chennai, India

Coordinates: 13.05623°N 80.23851°E

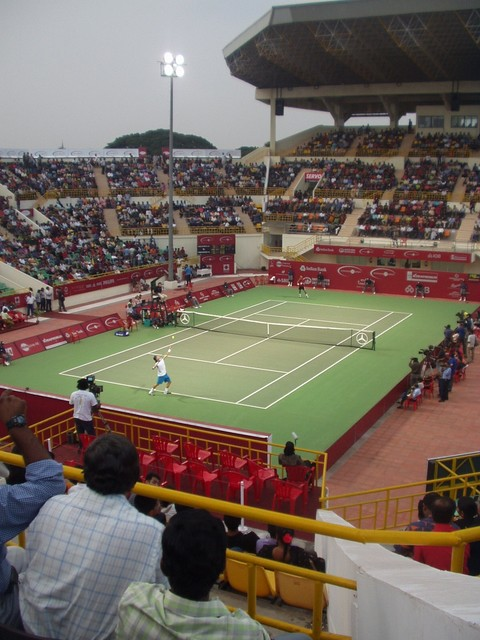
- Interactive map of SDAT Tennis Stadium
- Location: Chennai, Tamil Nadu, India
- Owner: Government of Tamil Nadu
- Capacity: 5,800 (tennis)
- Surface: Hard, Outdoors

Construction
- Built: 1995

Tenants
- Chennai Open (tennis) (2022–present); Davis Cup (India vs Australia) (May 2009) (V Chennai Warriors (November/December 2015)

Sports Development Authority of Tamil Nadu Tennis Stadium, commonly known as SDAT Stadium, sometimes also called Nungambakkam Tennis Stadium, is located in Nungambakkam, Chennai, Tamil Nadu, India. The stadium was built in 1995 by the Government of Tamil Nadu on the occasion of South Asian Federation Games held in Chennai that year. The stadium was the venue for the Chennai Open ATP Tennis championships held in the first week of January from 1997 to 2017. The stadium witnessed some dramatic scenes in 1998 when legends like Boris Becker and Patrick Rafter took part in the then named Goldflake Open. Rafter went on to win the tournament. Since 2022 it has been the host of the Chennai Open, also known as the Indian Open, held on the WTA Tour.

The stadium also witnessed the birth of the celebrated Indian doubles pair of Leander Paes and Mahesh Bhupathi who won the first three editions of the Goldflake Open. The complex has five hardcourts including the floodlit centre court which has a seating capacity of about 5,800.

The third round Davis Cup tie in Asia/Oceania Group I between India and Australia took place at the SDAT Tennis Stadium in May 2009.

The stadium again hosted a Davis Cup tie from 17 to 19 September 2010. The India Davis Cup team defeated the Brazil Davis Cup team in the 2010 Davis Cup World Group play-offs to advance to the 2011 Davis Cup World Group.

== Renovation ==
In October 2013, the Tamil Nadu government ordered renovation of the stadium at a cost of ₹ 45 million.

== See also ==
- List of tennis stadiums by capacity
