= Kalina Stadium =

Tennis stadium in Mumbai, Maharashtra

- Interactive map of Kalina Stadium
- Full name: Kalina Stadium
- Location: Mumbai, India
- Owner: All India Tennis Association
- Operator: All India Tennis Association
- Capacity: 5,000

Construction
- Groundbreaking: 2006
- Opened: 2006
- Renovated: 2014

Website
- DNA

Kalina Stadium is a tennis stadium in Kalina Mumbai, India. It has a centre court, six match courts and six warm-up courts. The stadium is a joint venture of Government of Maharashtra, the All India Tennis Association (AITA) and Mumbai University. As the city lacks proper infrastructure for tennis, despite having many facilities, then Chief Minister of Maharashtra Vilasrao Deshmukh agreed to construct this state-of-the-art stadium for tennis. The stadium is home of Mumbai Tennis Masters which plays in Champions Tennis League.
