= Bangalore Raptors =

Indian tennis team

Mumbai Tennis Masters
- Founded: 2014
- League: CTL
- Based in: Bangalore, Karnataka
- Owner: Mittu Chandilya, Inga Chandilya

Bangalore Raptors was a tennis team representing the city of Bangalore in 2014 Champions Tennis League.

The team is owned by Mittu Chandilya and the players representing this team were Thomas Enqvist, Feliciano López, Venus Williams, Ramkumar Ramanathan, Sowjanya Bavisetty, vishwaa arumugam, Vinod Cheruku Vasisht.
