= Raptor =

Raptor(s) or RAPTOR may refer to:

== Animals ==
The word "raptor" refers to several groups of avian and non-avian dinosaurs which primarily capture and subdue/kill prey with their talons.

- Raptor (bird) or bird of prey, a bird that primarily hunts and feeds on vertebrates
- Raptor- or -raptor, a taxonomic affix used in to describe dromeosaurs or similar animals
- Dromaeosauridae, a family of dinosaurs including Velociraptor, Utahraptor, Microraptor
- Oviraptorosauria, a clade of dinosaurs including Oviraptor and Gigantoraptor
- Megaraptora, a clade of dinosaurs including Fukuiraptor

== Arts and entertainment ==
=== Film and television ===
- Raptor (film), 2001
- Raptor, a fictional spacecraft in Battlestar Galactica

=== Gaming ===
- Raptor: Call of the Shadows, a 1994 video game
- Raptor heavy fighter, a fictional craft in the Wing Commander game
- Lord Raptor, a Darkstalkers character
- Landon Harrison (codenamed Raptor), an operator from Delta Force (2025 video game)

=== Literature ===
- Raptor (novel), 1993, by Gary Jennings
- Raptor (Gary Wilton, Jr.), a Marvel Comics character
- Raptor (Damon Ryder), a Marvel Comics character
- Raptor (Brenda Drago), a Marvel Comics character
- Raptor (DC Comics), various DC Comics characters

=== Roller coasters ===
- Raptor (Fantasilandia), in Santiago, Chile
- Raptor (Gardaland), in Lake Garda, Italy
- Raptor (Cedar Point), in Sandusky, Ohio, U.S.

=== Other arts and entertainment ===
- Raptor (Thai duo), a music group
- Rex Raptor, a Yu-Gi-Oh! character

== Computers and programming ==
- Raptor (programming language), a graphical authoring tool
- Raptor (robot), a South Korean bipedal robot
- RAPTOR (software), protein threading software
- Western Digital Raptor, hard disk drives
- Raptor code, error correction code
- Gecko (software) or Raptor
- Raptor RDF, from the Redland RDF Application Framework
- Raptor Computing Systems/Raptor Engineering, a company which sells computers with POWER9 processors

== Military ==
- Lockheed Martin F-22 Raptor, a US Air Force stealth fighter aircraft
- HSM-71 or the Raptors, a U.S. Navy helicopter squadron
- VMMT-204 or the Raptors, a U.S. Marine Corps Osprey training squadron
- Raptor-class patrol boat, a series of Russian high-speed coastal patrol boats
- RAPTOR (Reconnaissance Airborne Pod Tornado), a British Royal Air Force reconnaissance pod

== Sporting teams ==
=== United States ===
- American Raptors, a rugby union team based in Glendale, Colorado
- Everett Raptors, an American indoor football team
- Iowa Raptors FC, an American soccer team
- Ogden Raptors, an American baseball team
- Ridgefield Raptors, an American baseball team
- Rockford Raptors, an American soccer team
- Rock River Raptors, an American indoor football team

=== Elsewhere ===
- Bangalore Raptors, an Indian tennis team
- Bengaluru Raptors, an Indian badminton team
- Dunkin' Raptors, a Thai basketball team
- Lancashire Raptors, a British ice hockey team
- Raptors de Naucalpan, a Mexican American football team
- Toronto Raptors, a Canadian basketball team in the NBA
  - Raptors 905, a Canadian basketball team in the G-League; minor league affiliate of the Toronto Raptors

== Transportation ==
=== Air ===
- Aviate Raptor, a South African trike
- Independence Raptor, a German paraglider
- Raptor Aircraft Raptor, an American light aircraft kit

=== Land ===
- Ford Raptor, a line of pickup trucks
- Yamaha Raptor 660, an all-terrain vehicle
- Zagato Raptor, a concept car design
- Raptor, motorcycles by Cagiva
- Haval Raptor, a sport utility vehicle

=== Sea ===
- Raptor, a car ferry class used by Red Funnel

=== Space ===
- SpaceX Raptor, a rocket engine

== Other uses ==
- Raptor, a series of Peavey guitars
- Raptor, a downhill Birds of Prey ski course in Colorado, U.S.
- Raptor (G.I. Joe), an action figure
- Raptor convention, a convention in contract bridge
- Raptor Group, a private investing company founded by James Pallotta
- RPTOR, also known as raptor, a regulatory-associated protein
- Strike Force Raptor, a group within New South Wales Police Force targeting organised crime groups

== See also ==
- Rapture (disambiguation)
- RPTOR, a human gene
