= Rapture (Sosnowski novel) =

1996 novel by David Sosnowski

- First edition (US)
- Author: David Sosnowski
- Language: English
- Subject: Emergence of Angels
- Genre: Science fiction novel
- Publisher: Villard (US); Sceptre (UK)
- Publication date: September 3, 1996
- Publication place: United States
- Media type: Print (hardback & paperback)
- Pages: 295
- ISBN: 0-679-45174-9

Rapture is a 1996 novel by David Sosnowski. The overarching story of this book deals with the effects on society when normal people begin sprouting angelic wings. The story follows two main characters; Alexander 'Zander' Wiles is a petty crook suffering from acute agoraphobia, and Cassandra 'Cassie' O'Conner, a psychiatrist specializing in 'angels' and author of a pop-psychology book titled Angel Blues. Both live and work around Detroit, Michigan, and much of the story takes place either in Detroit or its suburbs.

== Plot ==
The book starts somewhere in the middle. Zander is attempting suicide by trying to jump off the smokestack of an industrial plant. Cassie is at the same plant intending to do a little night flying. Zander succeeds in knocking himself unconscious and breaking a wing. Cassie drags him to shore and calls paramedics, eventually having to instruct them on how to set the broken bones.

Roughly half of the book is involved with Zander and Cassie's backgrounds. Zander grew up in the shadows of industrial plants. His father died under mysterious circumstances and his stepfather locked Zander out when he turned 18. Zander quickly fell under the influence of a class-mate of his, a small-time drug dealer who soon taught Zander about running from the police and how to tell a good stash from a bad one. Zander eventually became a drug runner in his own right until he started undergoing some of the preliminary changes of 'angelism'. As the condition was completely unknown at the time, he thought he was simply dying and holed up in a rent-a-cottage facility, ordering in pizza and beer. Eventually, when he began growing the hard green casing that is the first visible sign, he realized he had something new and became an all-out hermit.

Once the wings had sprouted, Zander contacted his old drug buddy and the pair worked out a scam to get money from elderly people. Zander would pretend to be the Angel of Death, but announced that he could be put off by a monetary donation. It was not until the pair encountered another angel, this one dead for several weeks, that Zander realized that he was not alone. He assaulted his drug buddy, went to a talent agency and became a talk show star. Eventually, this too became tiresome and he once again became a hermit.

Cassie's story quite different. Her mother was a bisexual sculptor and a single parent. When Cassie's uncle left them an old farm, they moved out to the farmhouse and Cassie's mother continued her sculpting. Cassie and her mother were always outsiders in the community, never quite able to fit in and never quite wanting to, either. Eventually, Cassie moved to Ann Arbor and started attending the University of Michigan's medical college. While she was there, she 'contracted' angelism and spent her time in a 'coop,' a safehouse run by other angels where one could transform in security. Returning to school, Cassie realized that she did not really want to become a medical doctor, but still wanted to help people. She chose to become a psychiatrist, and specialized in angels.

Cassie's book Angel Blues is considered the definitive work on angel psychology (largely because there is no other work on angel psychology) but Cassie believes herself to be a fake; she claims she wrote the book to "meet Oprah." After having a falling out with her patients and her colleagues, she was diagnosed as a flying addict and received treatment for it. This is roughly the time when she saved Zander's life, and he set up a meeting between them to work on his agoraphobia.

Working with Zander re-enthused Cassie to get back to working with her regular patients. She began treating Zander's old drug buddy, who had partially transformed into an angel. To be precise he was a 'penguin,' an angel without the extensive nerves in his wings and lacking a sense of balance when upright. Therefore, he had to shuffle around the ground on all fours or be pushed in a wheelchair. Zander takes on the case, declaring that 'he doesn't need a psychologist... he needs an engineer.' Using a series of counterbalances and a walker, he gets his buddy on his feet again and effectively cures penguinism. It is about this point where Zander and Cassie begin really exploring the possibilities of a sexual relationship, beyond doctor-patient and friend-friend.

== Reception ==
Publishers Weekly gave a mixed review stating that "Sosnowski's portrait of a separate ""race"" of non-divine angels as a social phenomenon, and his strange mix of the cutesy and the apocalyptic, is original and sometimes clever. But his prose is often shop-worn and his storyline soon grows so freighted with ideas." While Kirkus kept it short commenting "a witty, clever, original debut."
