= Raptor (robot) =

- Inventor: Kaist
- Country: South Korea
- Year of creation: 2014
- Type: Bipedal (Dinosaur-like)
- Purpose: Technology Demonstrator
- Website: www.kaist.ac.kr/html/en/

Raptor (Korean: 랩터) is a bipedal robot which was designed and conceived in 2014 by the Korea Advanced Institute of Science and Technology (KAIST). It has a top speed of 46 km/h, making it the second fastest robot after the Cheetah, and the fastest bipedal robot worldwide. Designers at the KAIST took their inspiration from the Velociraptor, a bipedal dinosaur which balances itself with its tail. The robot moves itself with a pair of carbon / epoxy composite blade legs.
