= Raipur Rangers =

Champions Tennis League team in Raipur, India

- Nickname: RR
- Founded: 2015
- League: CTL
- Based in: Raipur, Chhattisgarh
- Stadium: Balbir Singh Juneja Indoor Stadium, Raipur

Raipur Rangers is a tennis team representing the Indian city of Raipur in Champions Tennis League. The players representing this team are Thomas Muster, Roberto Bautista Agut, Alizé Cornet, Ramkumar Ramanathan.

== Players ==
Player
(Austria) Thomas Muster
(Spain) Roberto Bautista Agut
(France) Alizé Cornet
(India) Ramkumar Ramanathan
