= Mumbai Tennis Masters =

- Founded: 2014
- League: CTL
- Based in: Mumbai, Maharashtra
- Stadium: Kalina Stadium
- Owner: Farhan Akhtar, P Rohit Reddy

Mumbai Tennis Masters is a tennis team representing the city of Mumbai in Champions Tennis League.

The players representing this team are Sergi Bruguera, Tommy Robredo, Alizé Cornet, Sriram Balaji, Pranjala Yadlapalli and Mohit Mayur Jayaprakash.
