= Steam rupture =

A steam rupture occurs within a pressurized system of super critical water when the pressure exceeds the design plus safety margin specification. A steam rupture can occur in any high temperature pressurized system, including, but not limited to: automobile cooling systems, stationary power plants, mobile power plants, steam driven tools (such as some trip hammers), and even the delivery systems for application processes such as cleaning and fabric fullering.
