= Nagpur Orangers =

- Nickname: Nagpur Orangers
- Founded: 2015
- League: CTL
- Based in: Nagpur, Maharashtra
- Stadium: Nagpur District Hard Court Tennis Association, Nagpur

Nagpur Orangers is a tennis team representing the Indian city of Nagpur in Champions Tennis League. The players representing this team are Àlex Corretja, Feliciano López, Jelena Janković, Divij Sharan.

== Players ==
Player
(Spain) Àlex Corretja
(Spain) Feliciano López
(Serbia) Jelena Janković
(India) Divij Sharan
