= Pune Marathas (tennis) =

Tennis team that represents Pune, India

- Founded: 2014
- League: CTL
- Based in: Pune, Maharashtra
- Owner: Mysport Management Private Limited

Pune Marathas is a tennis team representing the city of Pune, India, in Champions Tennis League. The franchise is owned by Mysport, which has been promoted by Rendezvous Group.

The players representing this team are Pat Cash, Marcos Baghdatis, Agnieszka Radwańska, Saketh Myneni, Shweta Rana and S D Prajwal Dev. Bollywood actor Shreyas Talpade is the team's brand ambassador.
