= Delhi Dreams =

- Founded: 2014
- League: CTL
- Based in: Delhi
- Owner: Ajay Devgn, Sanjeev Kassal

Delhi Dreams is a tennis team representing the city of Delhi in Champions Tennis League.

The players representing this team are Juan Carlos Ferrero, Kevin Anderson, Jelena Jankovic, Sanam Singh, Karman Kaur Thandi and Garvit Batra.
