= Punjab Marshalls =

- Founded: 2014
- League: CTL
- Based in: Punjab, India
- Owner: Gurpreet Singh 'Kiki'

Punjab Marshalls is a tennis team representing the Indian state of Punjab in Champions Tennis League. Punjab Marshalls won the Champions Tennis League (CTL) title after scoring a hard-fought 22–21 victory over Hyderabad Aces in the final of Champions Tennis League (2015). players representing this team are Greg Rusedski, Leander Paes, Elina Svitolina, Garbiñe Muguruza, Somdev Devvarman, Vidit Vaghela and Rishika Sunkara. The Team is owned and run by Mr. Gurpreet Singh (kiki). Gurpreet Singh Kiki has now expanded his business interests to owning this tennis team as he becomes co-owner of the Champions Tennis League's Punjab team. Gurpreet Singh represents that new breed of sports team owners who have diverse interests and millions of dollars to invest in passion.
