= Hyderabad Aces =

Tennis team

- Founded: 2014
- League: CTL
- Based in: Hyderabad, Telangana
- Owner: K. Rama Raju, Rajesh Dandu

Hyderabad Aces is a city tennis team of Hyderabad representing in Champions Tennis League.

The players representing Hyderabad include Mark Philippoussis, Mikhail Youzhny, Martina Hingis and Jeevan Nedunchezhiyan.
