= Champions Tennis League =

Indian team tennis tournament

- Sport: Team tennis
- First season: 2014
- Folded: 2015
- Director: Vijay Amritraj
- Motto: Bigger, Better, Stronger!
- No. of teams: 6 teams from 6 cities
- Country: India
- Website: Champions Tennis League

The Champions Tennis League (CTL) was a team tennis tournament in India held two times only in November 2014 and in late 2015, across six Indian cities. The first edition of Champions Tennis League was held from 17 to 26 November 2014, across Mumbai, Hyderabad, Delhi, Pune, Bangalore, and Chandigarh. The second edition was held from 23 November to 6 December 2015.

== Background ==
The Champions Tennis League is a professional tennis league held in India where the team captains are Grand Slam veterans and the players are among the best in the world. It is a privately owned tennis league, owned and operated by Vijay Amritraj's sports management company Second Serve Pvt. Ltd., which operates other integrated sports and entertainment formats in India and overseas.

== Format ==
The player draft for each season of CTL is conducted without an auction with each team picking four players from a pool of 24. The pool consists of six legends, six international ATP players, six international WTA players, and six Indian players. Each CTL team features an ATP and WTA player, an international legend as their playing captain, a noted Indian male tennis player, plus a top ranked junior Indian girl and boy.

The league consists of six teams, split into two zones. Each zone has three teams, with each team playing the other two teams on a home and away basis to decide the zonal standings. Two teams competing against each other is called a tie. The teams with the highest number of games (not sets) won in their respective zones will advance to the final, where they play each other for the Champions Tennis League trophy.

Apart from the Champions Tennis League Cup, two individual awards are given out: the Robert Amritraj award and the Margaret Amritraj award. The Robert Amritraj award is given to the Most Valuable Player (MVP) who has won the most games throughout the tournament, while the Margaret Amritraj award is given to the best Indian player in the tournament, who has won the most games among the Indian players.

=== 2014 format ===
In 2014, the CTL saw 13 matches played over a 10-day period between 17 and 26 November. Each tie consisted of 5 sets, with each considered as a match. The winner of a match was the player / doubles team that won 6 games. The winner of the tie was the team that won the highest number of games across all 5 sets. The winners' prize money was Rs. 1 crore, while the runner-up prize was Rs. 50 lakhs.

=== 2015 format ===
The 2015 edition of CTL was announced by Vijay Amritraj on 23 September 2015, at a press conference in Mumbai. The press conference also saw the draft of the players into each team. In 2015, CTL featured six city based teams across India and saw 13 matches played over a 2-week period between 23 November and 6 December. The winners' prize money was Rs. 1 crore, while the runner-up prize was Rs. 50 lakhs.

Each tie will consist of 5 sets with each set being considered as a match. Unlike the 2014 edition, the winner of a match was the player/doubles team that wins 5 games, not 6. The winner of the tie was the team that wins the highest number of games across all 5 sets.

== Editions ==
=== 2014 Champions Tennis League ===
The first edition of Champions Tennis League was held for 10-day period between 17 and 26 November 2014. The tournament started in Mumbai, progressed through Hyderabad, Bangalore, Pune, Delhi, Chandigarh, before closing out with the finals in Delhi.

Final

Date	Fixture	Score	Venue
26 November 2014	Pune Marathas v Delhi Dreams	27–23	R.K. Khanna Tennis Complex, Delhi

=== 2015 Champions Tennis League ===
The second edition of Champions Tennis League was held for two weeks between 23 November to 6 December 2015. The tournament started in Mumbai, progressed through Chennai, Chandigarh, Hyderabad, Raipur, Nagpur, before closing out with the finals in Hyderabad.

Final

Date	Fixture	Score	Venue
6 December 2015	Punjab Marshalls v Hyderabad Aces	22–21	Fateh Maidan, Hyderabad, Telangana

== Broadcast ==
In India, all Champions Tennis League matches broadcast live on Sony SIX HD and Sony KIX, who have the exclusive broadcasting rights for the event in the Indian subcontinent. The Tennis Channel, shall broadcast Champions Tennis League across the USA.

== See also ==
- Tennis Premier League
- International Premier Tennis League
- World TeamTennis
