= Indian civilization =

Indian civilization may refer to:

- the country of India
- Culture of India
- History of India
- Greater India
- List of pre-Columbian cultures, for the indigenous cultures of the Americas

== See also ==
- Indus Valley Civilisation
- Indosphere
- Indianisation
- Indian art
- Architecture of India
- History of Indian influence on Southeast Asia
  - Mandala (political model)
- Indian Century
- Indocentrism
- Sanskritisation
