= Americentrism =

Idea that US culture is most important

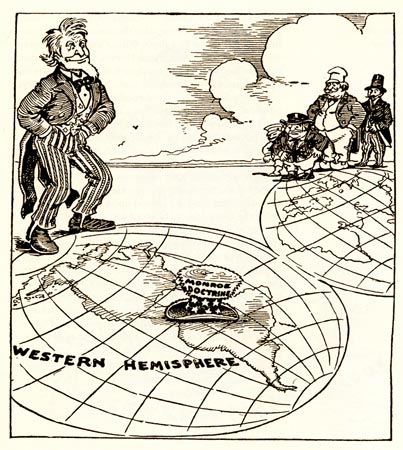
A 1912 newspaper cartoon highlighting the United States' influence in Latin America following the Monroe Doctrine

Americentrism, also known as American-centrism or US-centrism, is a tendency to assume the culture of the United States is more important than those of other countries or to judge foreign cultures based on American cultural standards. It refers to the practice of viewing the world from an overly US-focused perspective, with an implied belief, either consciously or subconsciously, in the preeminence of American culture.

The term is not to be confused with American exceptionalism, which is the assertion that the United States is qualitatively different from other nations and is often accompanied by the notion that the United States has superiority over every other nation.

== History ==
Scholarship of Americentrism traces the ideological system's origins, historically, to the late 1700s following the established independence of the United States. Americentrism is presented as a shift from Eurocentrism that idolizes the newly founded United States' ideals of freedom and democracy.

Such scholarship itself was initially built on Jim Blaut's 1980s scholarship of Eurocentrism by Geographer Richard Peet whom coined the term in his 2005 journal, From Eurocentrism to Americanism.

== In the media ==
American television networks have been perceived to contain an Americentric bias in the selection of their material.

Another instance of Americentrism is in the high focus companies have on US markets in relation to others. Often, products produced and developed outside the US are still marketed as typically American.

According to the European Commission, internet governance (in particular that related to the NSA) is too Americentric. It criticized the major role of American company ICANN in its administration.

The English Wikipedia has been criticized for having an Americentric systemic bias with regards to its occasional preference towards US English sources, language, and spelling.

== In languages ==
US defaultism is the tendency for people, particularly those in the United States, to assume that the US is the default or only relevant context when discussing various topics. For example, in an online forum, people may talk about a policy that only applies to the US without identifying the locality being referenced.

US defaultism is about a lack of awareness or consideration for the global context, leading to the United States being treated as the unspoken default. This can be annoying or confusing for non-Americans looking for information on the internet.

== Criticism ==
=== Social justice ===
Critics of Americentrism denote the ideology in fear of misunderstandings between peoples or nations, and in some cases, escalating into severe racial conflicts or even wars. They claim that distorted Americentrism has the potential to foster racism, create chaos, or ignite armed conflicts.

Critics of American policies utilise the term in a negative context to highlight a deliberate, nationalistic ignorance displayed by the American government towards its own faults, warning of the possible distortion of international relations possible by followers of the ideology.

=== Education ===
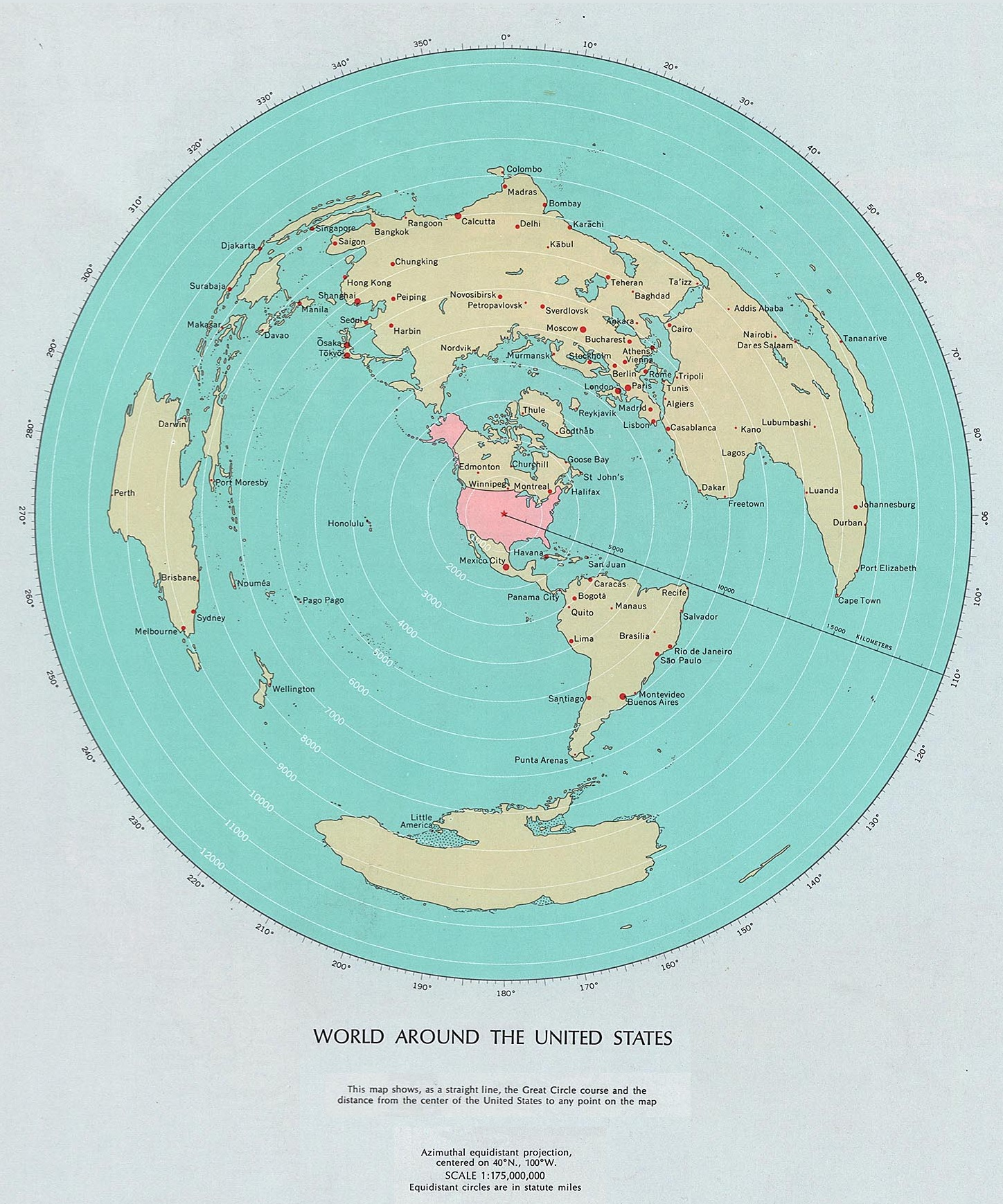
Azimuthal map centered in the USA

Educators have brought attention to the usage of Americentric views in American educational policy and scholarship. Critics have noted the usage of Americentric views specifically in the United States' public school systems' educational policy in world history. Sources claim that schools in the United States often tend to prioritise the detailed teaching of the history of Europe and the United States in their World History curriculum, while providing only brief coverage of events in Asia, Africa, and Latin America.

In terms of scholarship, it has been noted by various observers that the field of psychological research is predominantly influenced by Americans. It has been asserted that Americans hold the highest share as producers of psychological research, with a significant focus on studying Americans themselves. Therefore there have been criticisms of theories and principles derived from such research in if it is universally applicable to all human beings. Jeffrey Arnett, a professor of psychology at Clark University supports the idea, writing of scholarship, to his critique, disregarding the diversity of human experiences and contexts.

== See also ==
- American nationalism
  - American exceptionalism
  - American way
  - Anti-Americanism
- Discovery doctrine
- Ethnocentrism
  - Afrocentrism
  - Eurocentrism
  - Indocentrism
  - Sinocentrism
