= Farther India =

Old term for Southeast Asia

Coordinates: 14°13′12″N 101°51′36″E

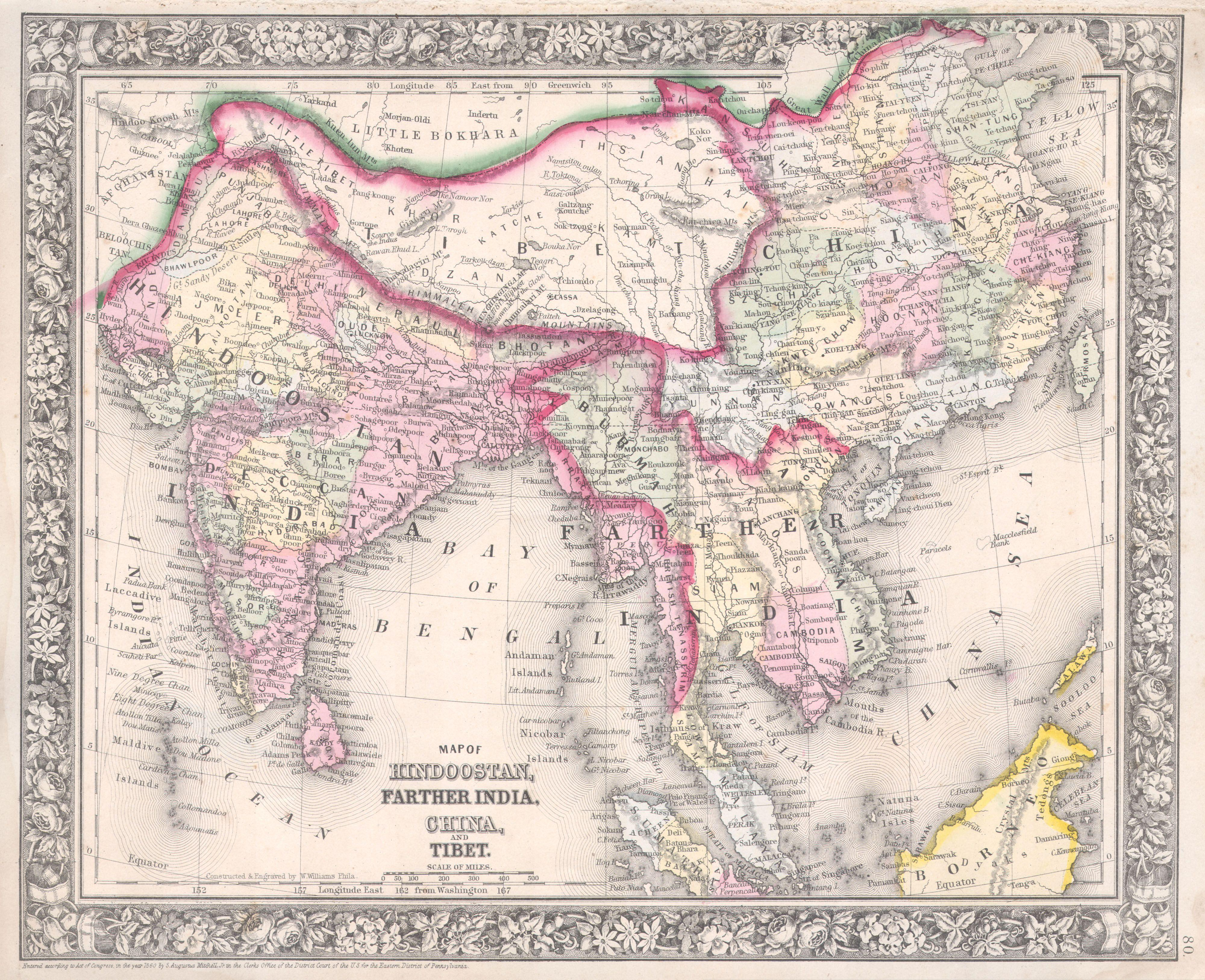
Farther India in Mitchell Map

Farther India, also known as Further India, is a historical geographical term used by European writers to describe Mainland Southeast Asia and parts of the Malay Archipelago. The term distinguished territories beyond the Indian subcontinent from the Indian Peninsula and was commonly used in geographical and historical writings during the eighteenth and nineteenth centuries. Its geographical boundaries varied among authors, and it was gradually superseded by the term Southeast Asia during the twentieth century.

It refers to Indochina (Cambodia, Laos, Myanmar (a.k.a. Burma), Thailand (former Siam), Vietnam, and West Malaysia) and the Malay states (Brunei, East Malaysia, Indonesia, and Singapore), but usually not including the Philippines or Timor-Leste; these neighbouring predominantly Malay states usually belong to the wider East Indies (which includes all of the above as well as the Indian subcontinent).

== Convention ==
The term Farther India historically referred to mainland and parts of maritime Southeast Asia, particularly territories beyond the Indian subcontinent. In historical geographical usage, it encompassed the Indochinese Peninsula, including present-day Myanmar, Thailand, Cambodia, Laos and Vietnam, as well as the Malay Peninsula and parts of the Indonesian archipelago. The geographical boundaries of the term varied among historical writers, and it was gradually replaced by the more widely used designation Southeast Asia.

During the eighteenth and nineteenth centuries, European writers used the term Farther India to describe territories beyond the Indian subcontinent. The term was generally applied to mainland Southeast Asia, while the Malay Archipelago or Indian Archipelago was used for the maritime region. Its geographical boundaries were not consistent, with some writers including a wider area extending between China and the Bay of Bengal. By the early twentieth century, the term had become less common, as the designation Southeast Asia gained wider acceptance.

== Other uses ==
Farther India is also a title of a book written by Sir Hugh Clifford. Hugh Clifford's Further India: Being the Story of Exploration from the Earliest Times in Burma, Malaya, Siam and Indo-China was published in London by Lawrence and Bullen in 1904 as part of "The Story of Exploration" series. It runs to 379 pages with illustrations, plates and a map. The book is a history of European exploration of the Indo-Chinese peninsula rather than a study of the term itself.

A review in The Spectator in December 1904 summarized its coverage, which ran from the ancient geographers' "Golden Chersonese" and Marco Polo to the Portuguese conquest of Malacca, its capture by the Dutch in 1641, and the expansion of the British East India Company. The reviewer said that the French explorer Francis Garnier's Mekong expedition takes up about a third of the book, and noted that the region's seclusion ended once British India was established. He called it an excellent monograph, though he faulted its proofreading and the lack of modern section maps. The book was later reprinted in Bangkok by White Lotus.

== See also ==
- ASEAN
- Greater India
  - Global Southeast
