= Indocentrism =

Ethnocentric perspective about India

Indocentrism is any ethnocentric perspective that regards India to be central or unique relative to other countries and holds that the "host" culture i.e. of India, is superior to others. Indian exceptionalism is a view that is held by many Indians. Among unique ideas held are that India is a civilization state with a superior culture and society, its perceived elaborate cohesive society of a wide range of ethnicities, and the widespread influence of its cuisine.

== Viewpoint ==
According to Indologist Michael Witzel, there is a recent tendency of indigenously minded historical revisionism and rewriting of India's history and archaeology in scholarly publications, media, the Internet and government publications. This Indocentric rewriting includes claims that the first human civilization in the world formed in India in c. 10,000 BC, that there is an uninterrupted continuity of the Indian civilization from 7500 BC to present, and that Indo-European speaking Aryan people populated by the immigrant people from the Indo-Gangetic Plain.

According to Science Historian Meera Nanda, Indocentrism is a concept in Indian historiography of science, akin to Eurocentrism, that asserts India as the originator of significant scientific contributions. It often assumes that if an idea appears in India and elsewhere concurrently, it must have originated in India. This approach has hindered recognition of potential influences from other regions, such as the South-East Asian transmission of Chinese numerals, challenging the conventional narrative of India as the exclusive source of mathematical innovations.

Numerous indocentric assertions regarding the Fibonacci sequence and the "golden ratio" in mathematics oversimplify the subject's historical context. Nowadays, there is a proliferation of articles and social media posts connecting the Fibonacci series and the golden ratio to Indian culture. Such indocentric claims tend to exaggerate their assertions, often neglecting to acknowledge the original innovators who deserve due credit in the field of mathematics.

According to Bengali anthropologist Sayeed Ferdous, Partition Studies have made significant progress in exploring the multifaceted impact of the 1947 Partition of India on people's lives and collective consciousness. However, the field exhibits a tendency towards Indocentrism, where Indian experiences dominate the narrative, overshadowing other perspectives. The nationalization of nostalgia post-Partition reshaped identities within nationalist contexts, making India a regional superpower. An "indocentric" approach dominated Partition studies, often overlooking perspectives outside of India. To gain a more comprehensive understanding, it's crucial to consider the broader regional impact and relationships between India, Bangladesh, and Pakistan.

== Responses of other countries ==
=== Sri Lanka ===
Much of Sri Lanka's early history has been described as having an Indocentric bias. This Indocentric bias in understanding Sri Lankan history led to a trend of Sri Lankan historians breaking away from the Indocentric bias in Sri Lankan history and instead focusing on Sri Lanka's historical and cultural links with Southeast Asia, which the country had close ties to. One of the most famous historians to break the Indocentric view of Sri Lankan history was Senarath Paranavithana who focused on Sri Lanka's connection with the Malay Peninsula and the rest of the Malay Archipelago. He established the "Malaya theory", claiming Sri Lanka's history with Kalinga was with the Kalingga Kingdom of Central Java, Indonesia and not with the Kalinga kingdom of eastern India.

== See also ==
- Akhand Bharat
- Greater India
- Indian nationalism
- Indianisation
