= Traditional games of Pakistan =

Pakistani pre-colonial sports heritage

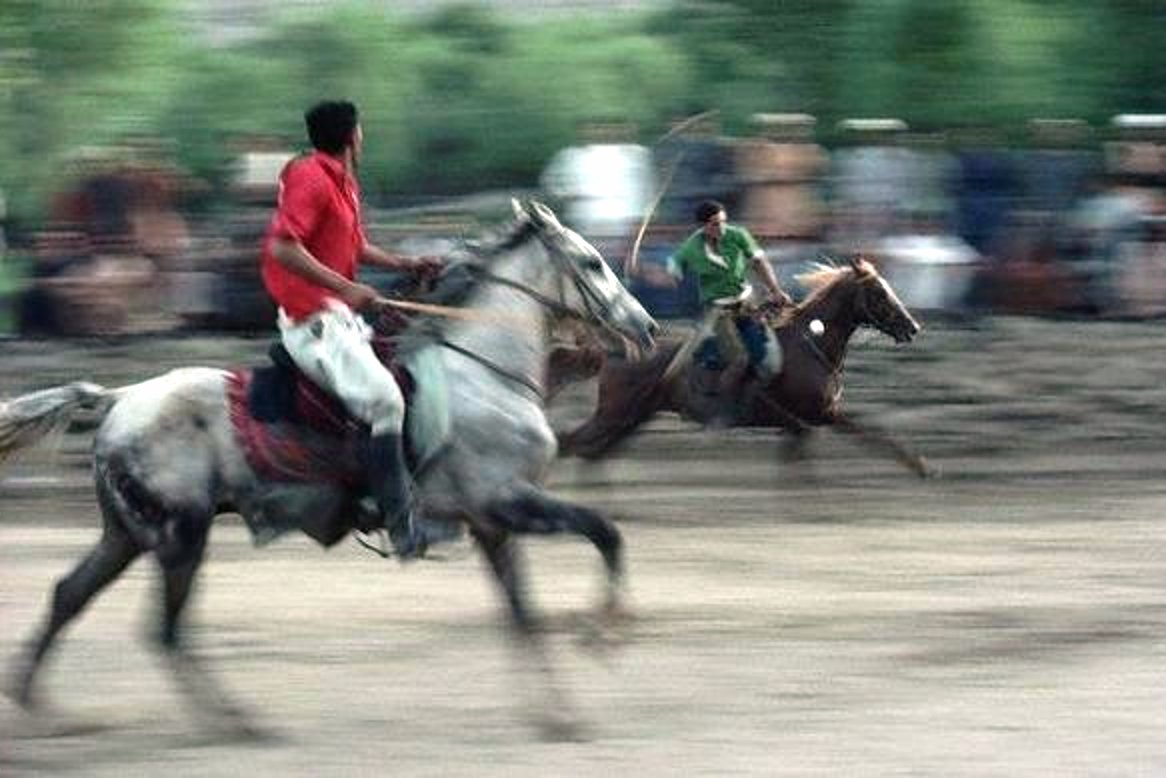
Two players on horseback during a game of polo.

Pakistan has many traditional games played in the rural and urban areas of the country.

== History ==
A lack of government funding, an increase in urbanisation, and the growth of Western sports have contributed to a decline in traditional sports.

== Traditional games ==
=== Gilli Danda ===
Gilli Danda revolves around players taking turns to use one stick to hit another stick as far as possible, while trying not to allow the other team to catch the airborne stick before it touches the ground.

=== Kite-flying ===
Kite fighting is common all over Pakistan, but mainly concentrated in cities in the Punjab and Sindh regions, including Faisalabad, Gujranwala, Karachi and Islamabad. Lahore considered a major centre in South Asia. In the past, kite battling had was a sport in the city, with kite fliers termed Khilari (Urdu: کھلاڑی/Punjabi: ਖਿਡਾਰੀ).

=== Pittu Garam ===
In Pittu Garam, one team throws a ball at a pile of seven stones and then attempts to put them back up as fast as possible, while the other team can throw the ball at players of the first team to eliminate them.

=== Marbles ===
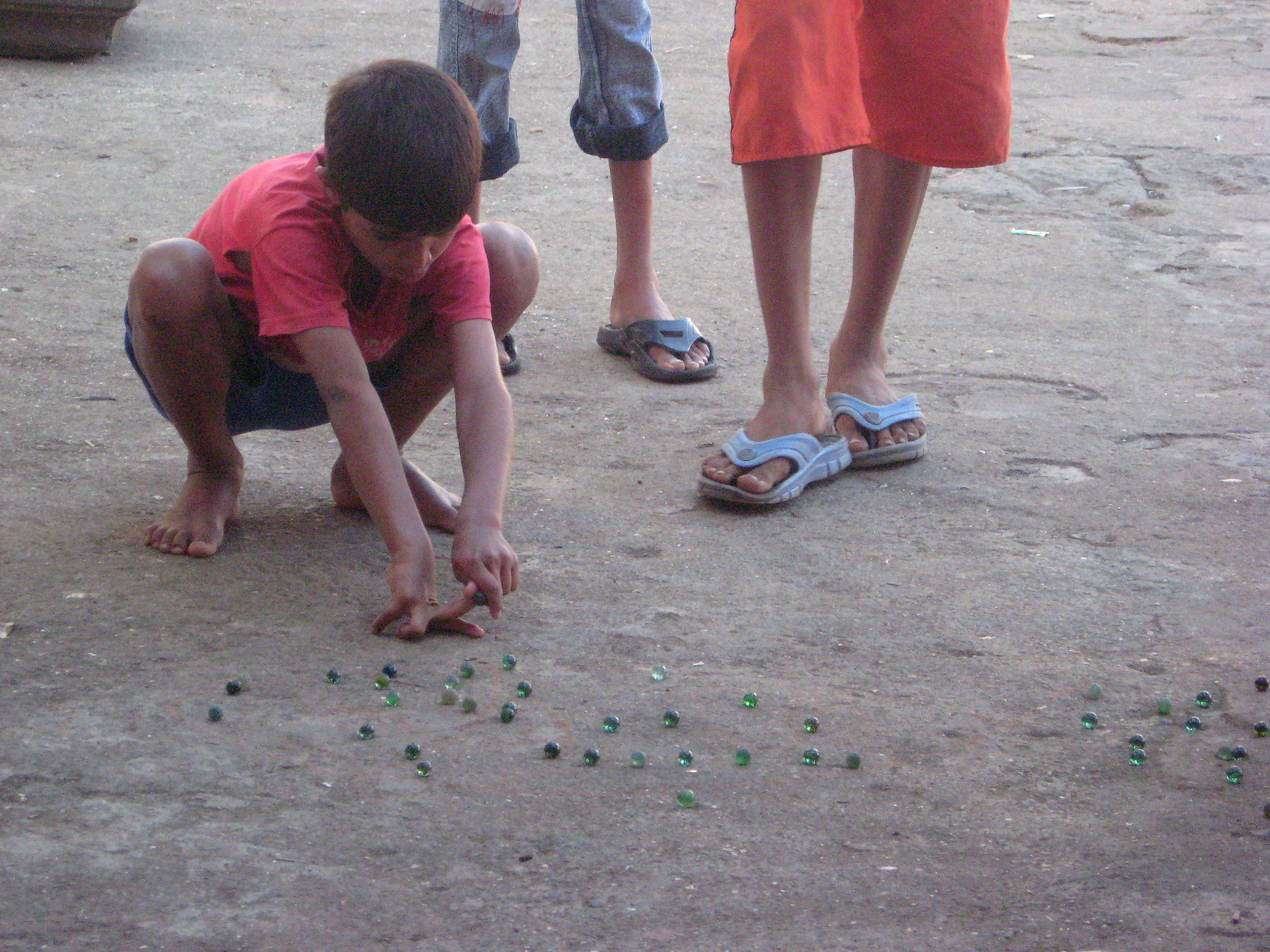
A child about to flick a marble.

Marbles, also known as bilori or shinoli in Pashto, is a family of games involving marbles.

=== Goli pila ===
Goli pila involves flicking marbles into small holes in the ground using one's fingers.

=== Chindro ===
Chindro (also known as Stapoo or Kidi Kada) is a game popular in the Indian subcontinent. The game is played with a stone that is tossed or slid on a marked-off playing court. It is similar to hopscotch.

=== Slap kabaddi ===
Slap kabaddi or thappad kabaddi is a Pakistani variant of kabaddi which is particularly popular in Punjab. Two players aim to slap each other, scoring one point for each slap landed on the opponent; the winner is the one who scores the most points, or who can force his opponent to forfeit the match.

Punches are not allowed, though players can slam into each other. There is no time limit or limit to the number of slaps that can be executed, though causing injury to the opponent results in disqualification in some matches.,

== Tackling games ==
=== Malakhra ===
Malakhro () is an ancient Sindhi form of wrestling in Sindh, which dates back 5000 years. The match begins with both wrestlers tying a twisted cloth around the opponent's waist. Each one then holds onto the opponent's waist cloth and tries to throw him to the ground. Malakhra is one of the favorite sports among males in Sindh, Pakistan. Malakhara matches are generally held on holidays and Fridays and are a feature of all fairs and festivals. Rich feudal lords and influential persons maintain famous Malhoo (wrestlers) and organize matches for them. In the Pakistani region of Sindh, it is the provincial sport.

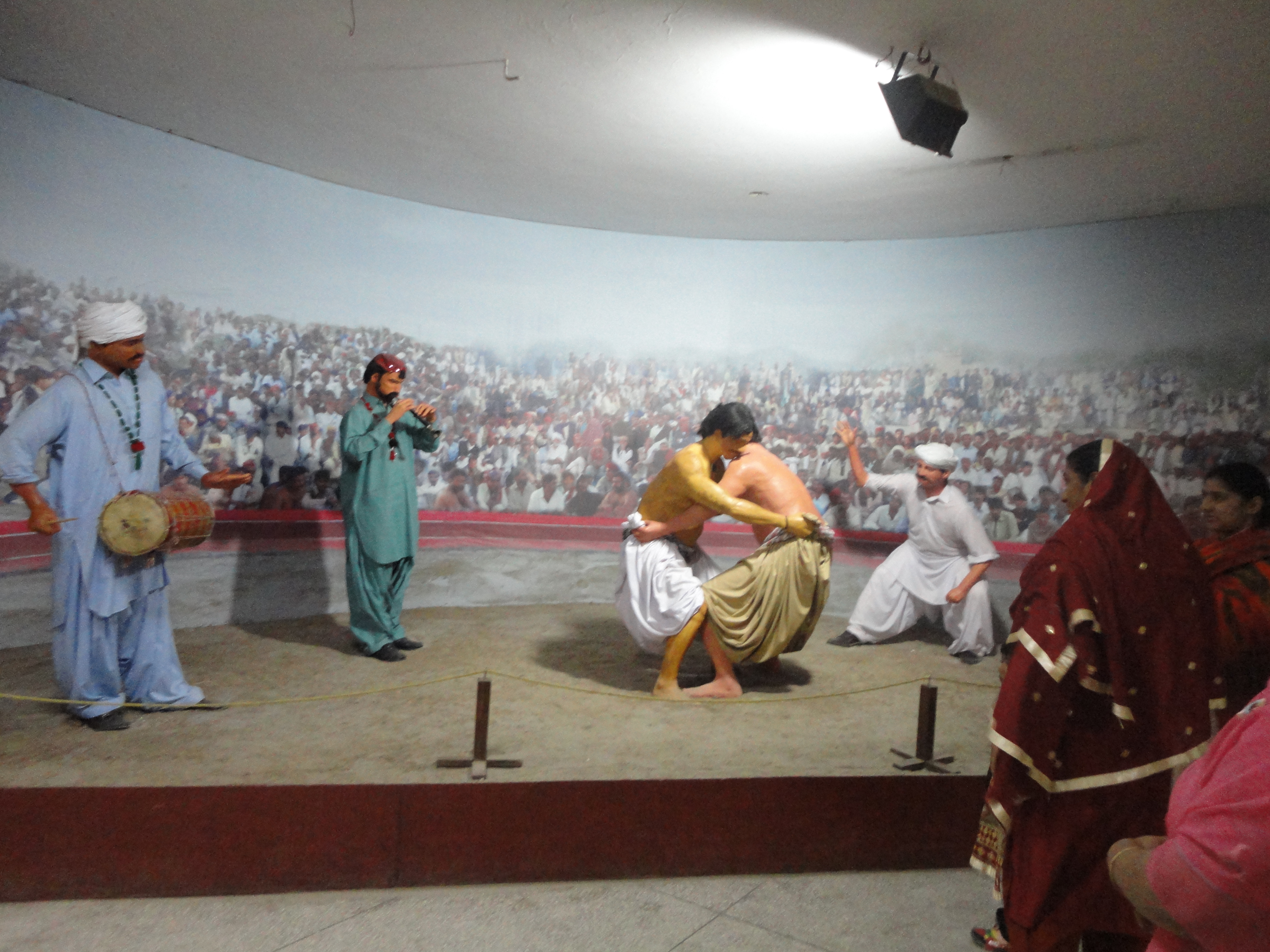
a model of Malakhiro at ISJ

=== Yanda ===
Yanda (also known as Yenda, Yandu, etc.) is a game of Khyber Pakhtunkhwa in which the teams take turns sending one of their players to run around a circle, while two opponents attempt to make the runner fall before he can run around the entire circle and safely make it back to his teammates. Players who are made to fall are eliminated from the game. The game ends once one team has all of its players eliminated, with the other team then winning the game.

== Variations of tag ==
=== Kabaddi ===
Kabaddi (/kəˈbædi/, /ˈkʌbədi/) is a contact team sport played between two teams of seven players. It is one of the traditional games of South Asia. In the game, a raider enters the opposing half of the court to tag the defenders and attempt to return within 30 seconds without being tackled. Points are awarded for successful tags, while defenders earn a point for tackling the raider. Tagged or tackled players are temporarily out but can re-enter when their team scores. Raids alternate between teams throughout the game.

=== Kho-kho ===
Kho kho is a traditional Indian sport that dates to ancient India. It is one of the most popular traditional tag games in the Indian subcontinent after kabaddi. Kho kho is played on a rectangular court with a central lane connecting two poles at either end of the court. During the game, nine players from the chasing team (attacking team) are on the field, with eight of them sitting (crouched) in the central lane, while three runners from the defending team run around the court and try to avoid being touched or caught. Each sitting player on the chasing team faces the opposite half of the field.

In the game, one player from the chasing team (the "active chaser" or "attacker") may run around the court to tag (touch) members of the defending team. Each successful tag earns one point, and tagged defenders must leave the field. However, the active chaser is restricted from crossing the central lane to access the other half of the court and cannot change direction once they begin running toward either pole. These restrictions can be bypassed if the active chaser either switches roles with a sitting teammate — by touching them on the back while saying "Kho" — who is facing the other half of the court, or by running behind either pole to switch direction or halves. Each team alternates between scoring and defending, with two turns for each role. Each turn lasts nine minutes, and the team with the highest score at the end of the game wins.

Kho-kho is traditional for some people in Punjab and Sindh.

=== Wanjh wati ===
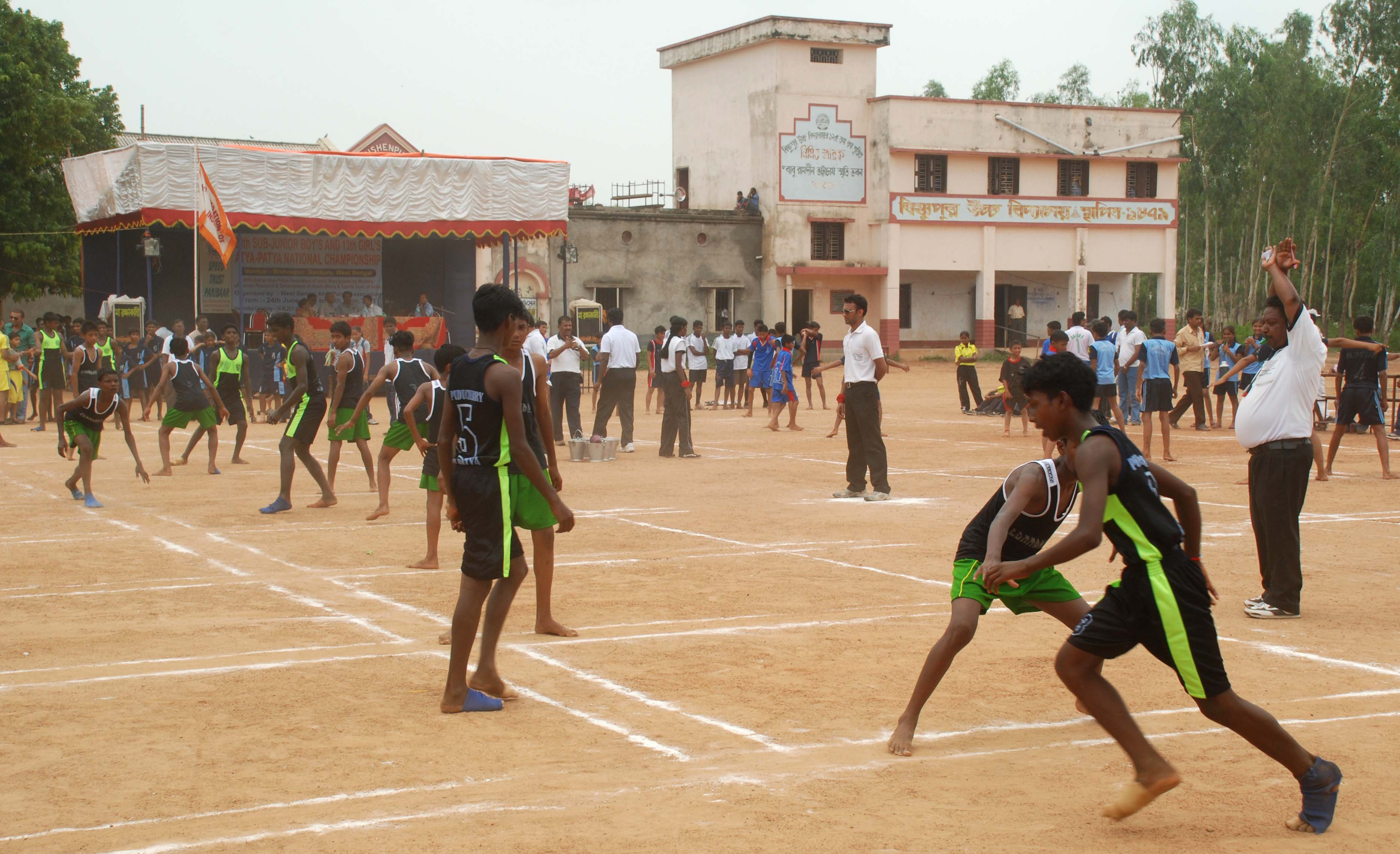

External videos
- Maharashtra – 27th Senior National Championship, August 2012,, Tamil Nadu semi-final match in YouTube video
- Senior National Atya Patya Championship, Hyderabad 2012, final: Puducherry v/s Maharashtra, YouTube video

Atya patya (Marathi: आट्यापाट्या) is a traditional South Asian tag sport played by two sides of nine players. It is more popular in rural areas of India. It is more commonly played in Maharashtra, a western Indian state. Atya patya is described as a "game of feints". The playing area comprises nine trenches, coming out of either side of a central trench; a point is awarded to the attacking team's players for each trench they cross without being tagged out by the defensive players within the trenches. The game ends after 4 innings (scoring turns) of 7 minutes each, with each team having two innings to score. It has been described as a game of "militant chase". The sport is played in a relatively small area and requires no equipment, similar to other games indigenous to India such as kabaddi, seven stones, kho kho, gillidanda and langdi.

Wanjh wati is traditional to Sindh.

=== Baraf Paani ===
Players become frozen in place when tagged by an opponent, but are unfrozen by the touch of a teammate.

=== Oonch Neech ===
Oonch Neech (or Oonch Neech ka Papada) is a rural and urban street children's game and variation of tag played in North India and Pakistan. Oonch Neech (Hindi) translates to Up and Down in English.

In Oonch Neech if the denner (tagger) says neech (down), all players have to go to an elevated area. If he says oonch (up) then all players have to stay down. Whatever the denner picks, he has to stay on that platform.

=== Langri Pala ===
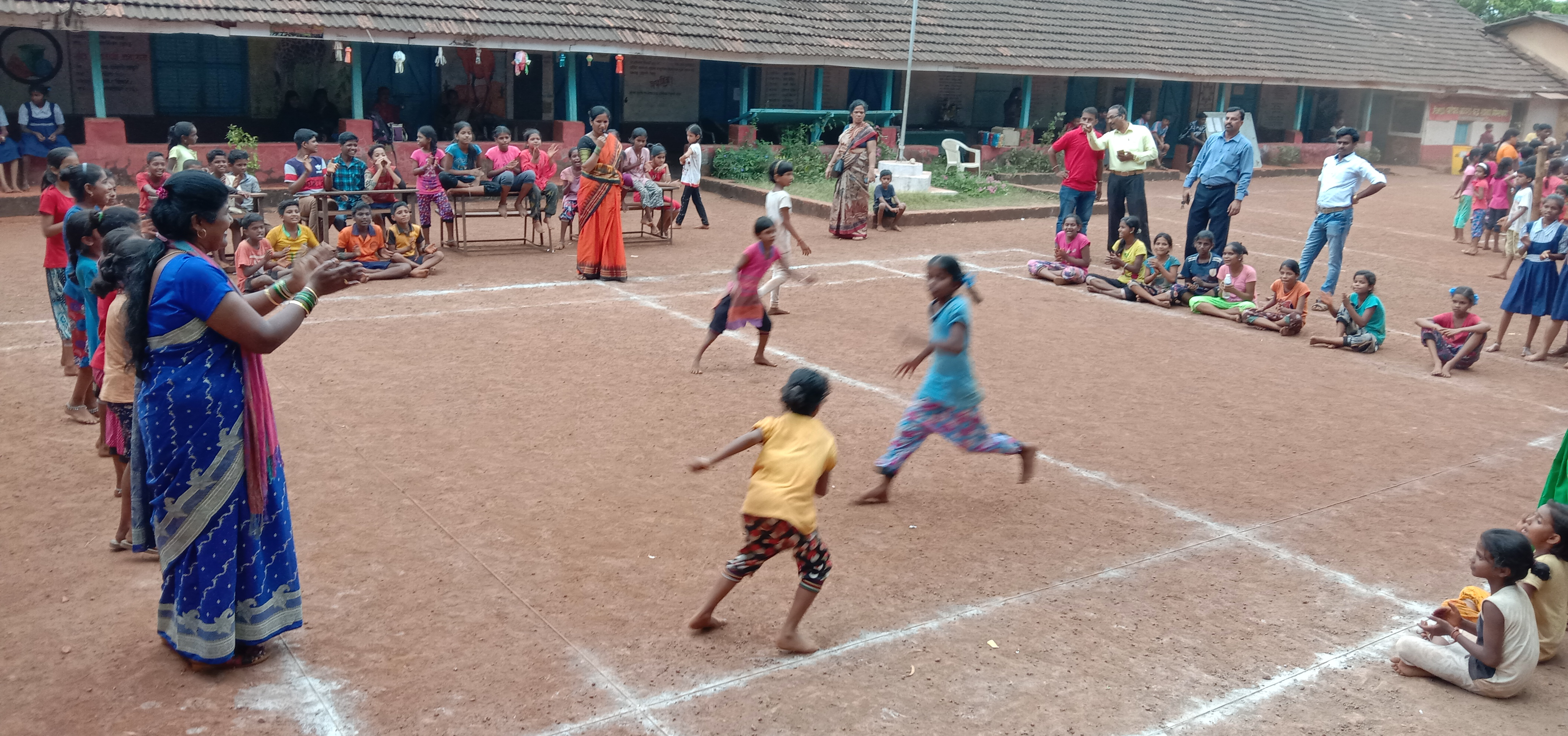
A child (in blue) hops around trying to tag other players in the field.

Players attempt to tag opponents while hopping on one foot.

=== Jee ===
Jee is a traditional Balochi game in which one team attempts to send one player at a time from one area to another without being tagged out by the opponents.

=== Bandar killa ===
Before the game starts, a coin toss-like process known as pugan pugayee is done, in which three players are chosen randomly and are asked to face one of their hands either upwards or downwards; if one of the player faces their hand in the opposite direction of the other two players, then that player is eliminated from this process; this repeats until finally, one player in the last group of three faces their hand in the opposite direction of the other two players, with this last player being chosen as the "monkey" (bandar). Once the monkey is chosen, the other players place their footwear around a tree or similar object; a rope is then bound to the tree, with the monkey required to hold the rope and continuously run around the tree. The other players then attempt to retrieve their footwear, but if any player is tagged by the monkey, play restarts and the tagged player becomes the new monkey. If all of the footwear is successfully retrieved, then the monkey is forced to run to a designated area away from the tree, while the other players are allowed to throw the footwear at the monkey. Play then restarts with all players continuing in their roles.

== Board games ==
=== Carrom ===
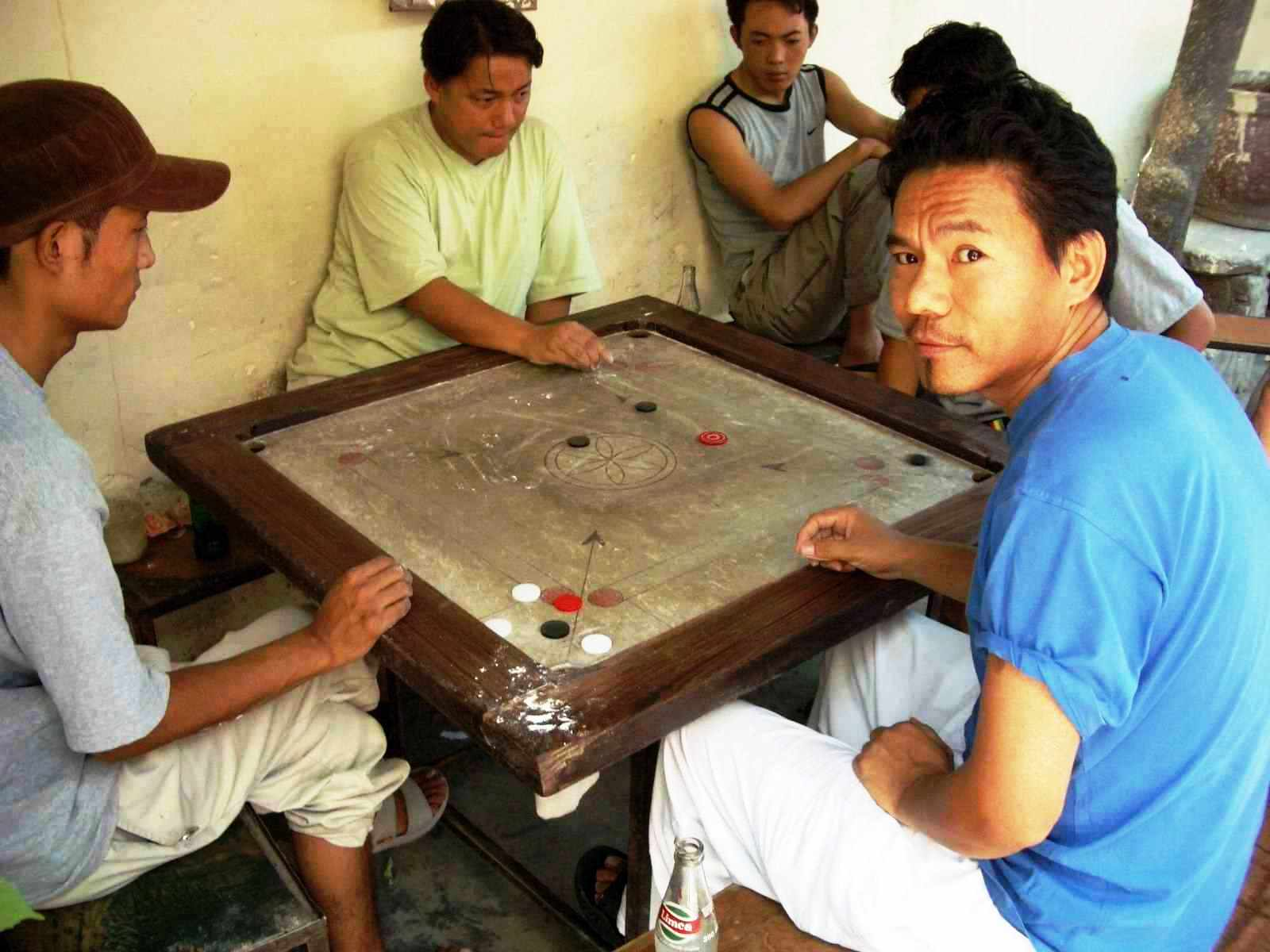
Tibetans playing carrom in Delhi

Carrom is a tabletop game of Indian origin in which players flip or flick discs, attempting to knock them to the corners of the board, in a similar fashion to billiards. Throughout South Asia, many clubs and cafés hold regular carrom tournaments. Carrom is commonly played by families, including children, and at social gatherings. Different standards and rules exist in different areas.

== Animal events ==
=== Chirpiest Partridge ===
Various caged partridges are placed next to each other, with the chirpiest of them winning the day's contest.

=== Tent pegging ===
The United States Tent Pegging Association (USTPA) is a not-for-profit organization registered in the New York state and is the National Governing Body for the sport of tent pegging in the US. USTPA is the premier equestrian sports body dedicated solely to the promotion and development of the equestrian sport of tent pegging across the US In Pakistan tent pegging is also named neza bazi. It is played in Punjab, Khyber Pakhtunkhwa and some parts of Sindh and Balochistan, it is the unofficial provincial sport of Balochistan, Pakistan. There are many clubs who have owned different and unique style of Turban and Waistcoat to identify their clubs. People decorate their horses for the competition. Every club arranges a neza bazi competition. All clubs are invited to participate in the competition. There are some specific shows being arranged since many decades. National Horse and Cattle Show is one of them. It is held at the Fortress Stadium in Lahore every year usually in end of February or at first week of March. Tent pegging is a part of this event. Clubs from all the districts of Pakistan participates there. It is also popular with British Pakistanis.

== See also ==
- Traditional games of South Asia
  - Traditional games of Afghanistan
  - Traditional games of Bangladesh
  - Traditional games of India
  - Traditional games of Nepal
  - Traditional games of Sri Lanka
- All-Punjab Games
