= Traditional games of South Asia =

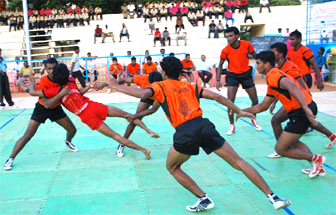
A tackle occurring in kabaddi, South Asia's most professionally played traditional game.

South Asia has many traditional games and sports. Two of them, kabaddi and kho-kho, are played at the South Asian Games, with kabaddi also featuring at the Asian Games. Many of these games are played across the entire subcontinent under different names and with some rule variations, while some of these games may be played only in certain countries or regions.

== History ==
=== Ancient era ===
Some traditional South Asian games, such as kabaddi, kho-kho, and atya-patya, are believed to be thousands of years old, finding mention in historical scriptures and dating back to ancient India. Kho-kho, for example, dates back to at least the fourth century BC. Many South Asian games likely reflect characteristics of traditional life in the subcontinent; for example, the Bengali hopscotch game of ekka-dokka (related to Stapoo and Chindro) may reflect the concepts of land division and ownership of property in ancient times.

=== Modern era ===
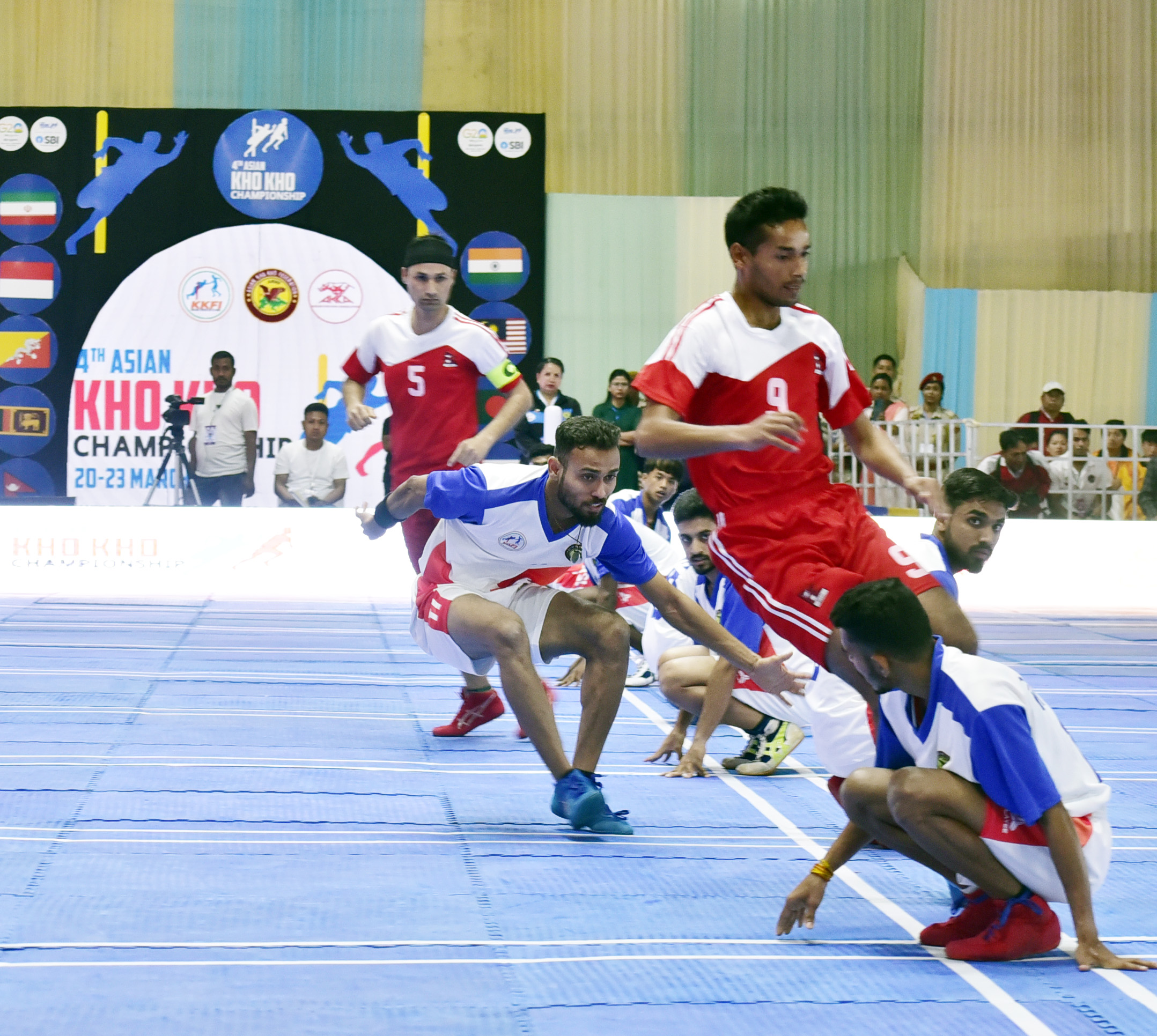
India vs Iran at the 2023 Asian Kho Kho Championship. Kho kho is South Asia's second-most popular tag game.

After the British colonisation of the subcontinent which peaked from the 19th century to 1947, Western sports such as cricket, football, and hockey began to be followed to a greater extent, to the detriment of the traditional games. The modern advent of urbanisation, globalisation (which attracted people towards more globally popular games), and technology (which gave people digital forms of entertainment such as the Internet, television, and video games) have further diminished the traditional South Asian sports. Additional reasons include religious extremism in some areas, which has restricted people from playing certain games, and lack of governmental support.

However, the affordability of the traditional games saw them prioritised for physical education purposes by some thinkers of the early postcolonial period, and some professional leagues are now being started for traditional sports, such as the Pro Kabaddi League, Ultimate Kho Kho, and Pro Panja League, which are beginning to revive interest in these sports and even globalise them. These leagues are now some of the most-watched competitions in India.

== Traditional games ==
=== Gillidanda ===
Gillidanda or gulli danda is a game where players attempt to hit a stick as far as possible to score points. It has similarities to the popular South Asian sport of cricket, as well as to traditional games around the world, such as tipcat.

=== Chindro ===
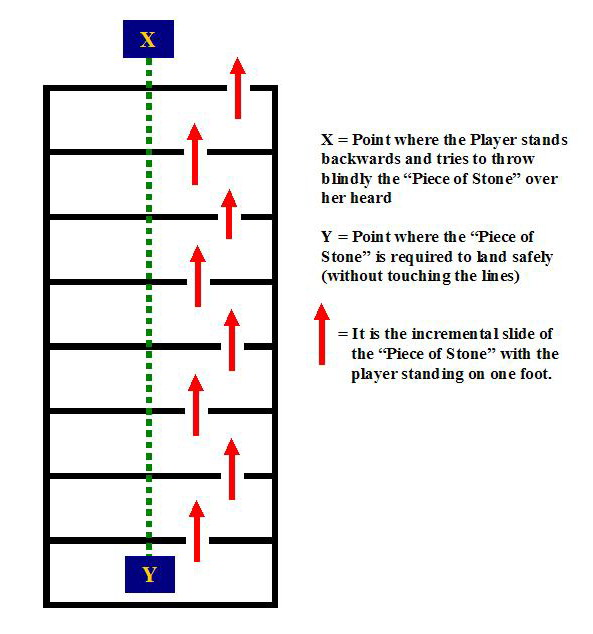
The area in which Chindro is played.

Chindro (also known as Stapoo or Kidi Kada) is a game popular in the Indian subcontinent. The game is played with a stone that is tossed or slid on a marked-off playing court. It is similar to hopscotch.

=== Gutte ===
Gutte (similar to Meergati and Bilghotti in Pakistan) involves players throwing up and then grabbing stones on the ground, while ensuring none of the stones falls from the air to the ground.

=== Dark room ===
Dark room is the same as hide-and-seek, except that it is played in an entirely dark room.

=== Donkey Donkey ===
Donkey Donkey (similar to the Pakistani Beech ki Billi) is a game in which two players attempt to throw a ball to each other, while a player in the middle tries to catch it.

== Ball games ==
=== Maram pitti ===
Maram Pitti is similar to Pakistan's Maran Kuttai.

=== Seven stones ===
In the game of seven stones (known by several other names in various regions), one team throws a ball at a pile of stones and then attempts to rebuild the pile, while the other team tries to eliminate the first team's players by throwing the ball at them.

== Variations of tag ==
=== Deciding who the denner is ===
In many South Asian variations of tag, the player meant to tag the other players is known as the "denner". There are various ways of selecting the denner, such as Saa Boo Three (also known as pugam pugai), in which a group of three players face one of their hands up or down, and if one of the players faces their hand the opposite way of the other two, then they are chosen as the denner.

=== Kabaddi ===
Kabaddi (/kəˈbædi/, /ˈkʌbədi/) is a contact team sport played between two teams of seven players. It is one of the traditional games of South Asia. In the game, a raider enters the opposing half of the court to tag the defenders and attempt to return within 30 seconds without being tackled. Points are awarded for successful tags, while defenders earn a point for tackling the raider. Tagged or tackled players are temporarily out but can re-enter when their team scores. Raids alternate between teams throughout the game.

=== Kho-kho ===
Kho kho is a traditional Indian sport that dates to ancient India. It is one of the most popular traditional tag games in the Indian subcontinent after kabaddi. Kho kho is played on a rectangular court with a central lane connecting two poles at either end of the court. During the game, nine players from the chasing team (attacking team) are on the field, with eight of them sitting (crouched) in the central lane, while three runners from the defending team run around the court and try to avoid being touched or caught. Each sitting player on the chasing team faces the opposite half of the field.

In the game, one player from the chasing team (the "active chaser" or "attacker") may run around the court to tag (touch) members of the defending team. Each successful tag earns one point, and tagged defenders must leave the field. However, the active chaser is restricted from crossing the central lane to access the other half of the court and cannot change direction once they begin running toward either pole. These restrictions can be bypassed if the active chaser either switches roles with a sitting teammate — by touching them on the back while saying "Kho" — who is facing the other half of the court, or by running behind either pole to switch direction or halves. Each team alternates between scoring and defending, with two turns for each role. Each turn lasts nine minutes, and the team with the highest score at the end of the game wins.

=== Freeze tag ===
Freeze tag (also known as Baraf Paani in North-India and Pakistan, and as Borof Paani in Bangladesh) involves players becoming "frozen" in place when tagged by an opponent, but becoming unfrozen when tagged by a teammate.

=== Atya-patya ===
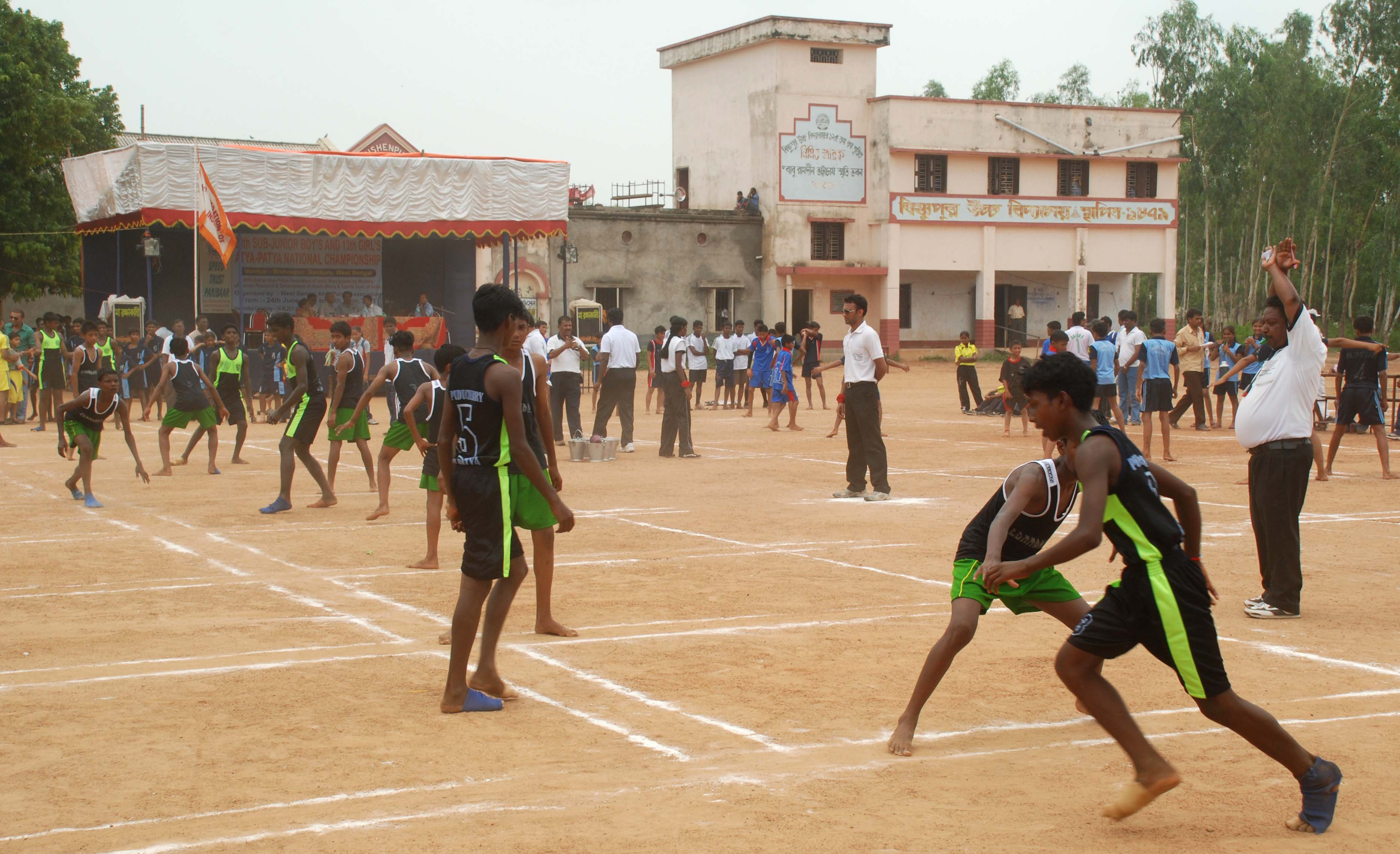

External videos
- Maharashtra – 27th Senior National Championship, August 2012,, Tamil Nadu semi-final match in YouTube video
- Senior National Atya Patya Championship, Hyderabad 2012, final: Puducherry v/s Maharashtra, YouTube video

Atya patya (Marathi: आट्यापाट्या) is a traditional South Asian tag sport played by two sides of nine players. It is more popular in rural areas of India. It is more commonly played in Maharashtra, a western Indian state. Atya patya is described as a "game of feints". The playing area comprises nine trenches, coming out of either side of a central trench; a point is awarded to the attacking team's players for each trench they cross without being tagged out by the defensive players within the trenches. The game ends after 4 innings (scoring turns) of 7 minutes each, with each team having two innings to score. It has been described as a game of "militant chase". The sport is played in a relatively small area and requires no equipment, similar to other games indigenous to India such as kabaddi, seven stones, kho kho, gillidanda and langdi.

=== Langdi ===
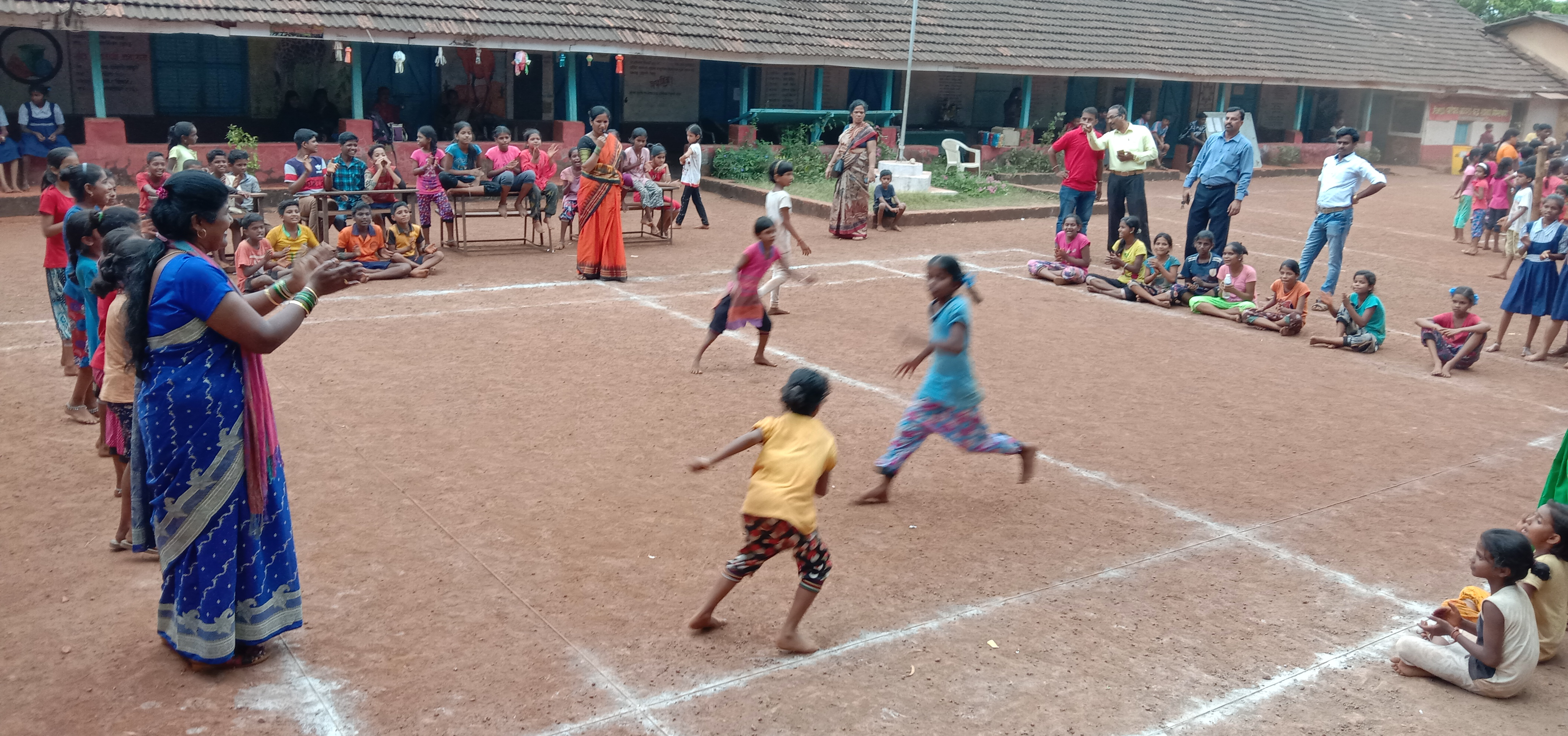
School kids play langdi during a inter-school competition

Langdi (Note: (Hindi: लंगड़ी) Also sometimes spelled Langadi.) is a traditional South Asian field sport which combines elements of tag and hopscotch. It was originally played during the Pandiyan Dynasty and called "Nondiyaattam" at that time. The teams alternate chasing (attacking) and defending roles in each of the 4 innings of the game, with the chasing team's players restricted to hopping around on one foot, and attempting to score points by tagging as many defenders as possible within the 9 minutes of each inning. It is described by Marathis as a sport with a Marathi ethos.

Langdi is considered to be useful in training for sports like kho kho, volleyball and gymnastics. The National Langdi Federation received national recognition in 2010.

=== Aankh micholi ===
Aankh micholi (similar to Bangladesh's Kanamachi) is a form of blindfolded tag.

=== Kokla chappaki ===
This game (similar to Rumal Chor and Bengal's Rumal Churi) is similar to duck, duck, goose.

=== Oonch Neech ===
Oonch Neech (or Oonch Neech ka Papada) is a rural and urban street children's game and variation of tag played in North India and Pakistan. Oonch Neech (Hindi) translates to Up and Down in English.

== Board games ==
=== Snakes and ladders ===
Snakes and ladders is a board game for two or more players regarded today as a worldwide classic. The game originated in ancient India as Moksha Patam ("liberation lesson"), and was brought to the United Kingdom in the 1890s. It is played on a game board with numbered, gridded squares. A number of "ladders" and "snakes" are pictured on the board, each connecting two specific board squares. The object of the game is to navigate one's game piece, according to die rolls, from the start (bottom square) to the finish (top square), helped by climbing ladders but hindered by falling down snakes.

Another traditional game called Ludo, is mostly played at the same board on the other side. Four participants can play this game with the help of dice.

=== Carrom ===
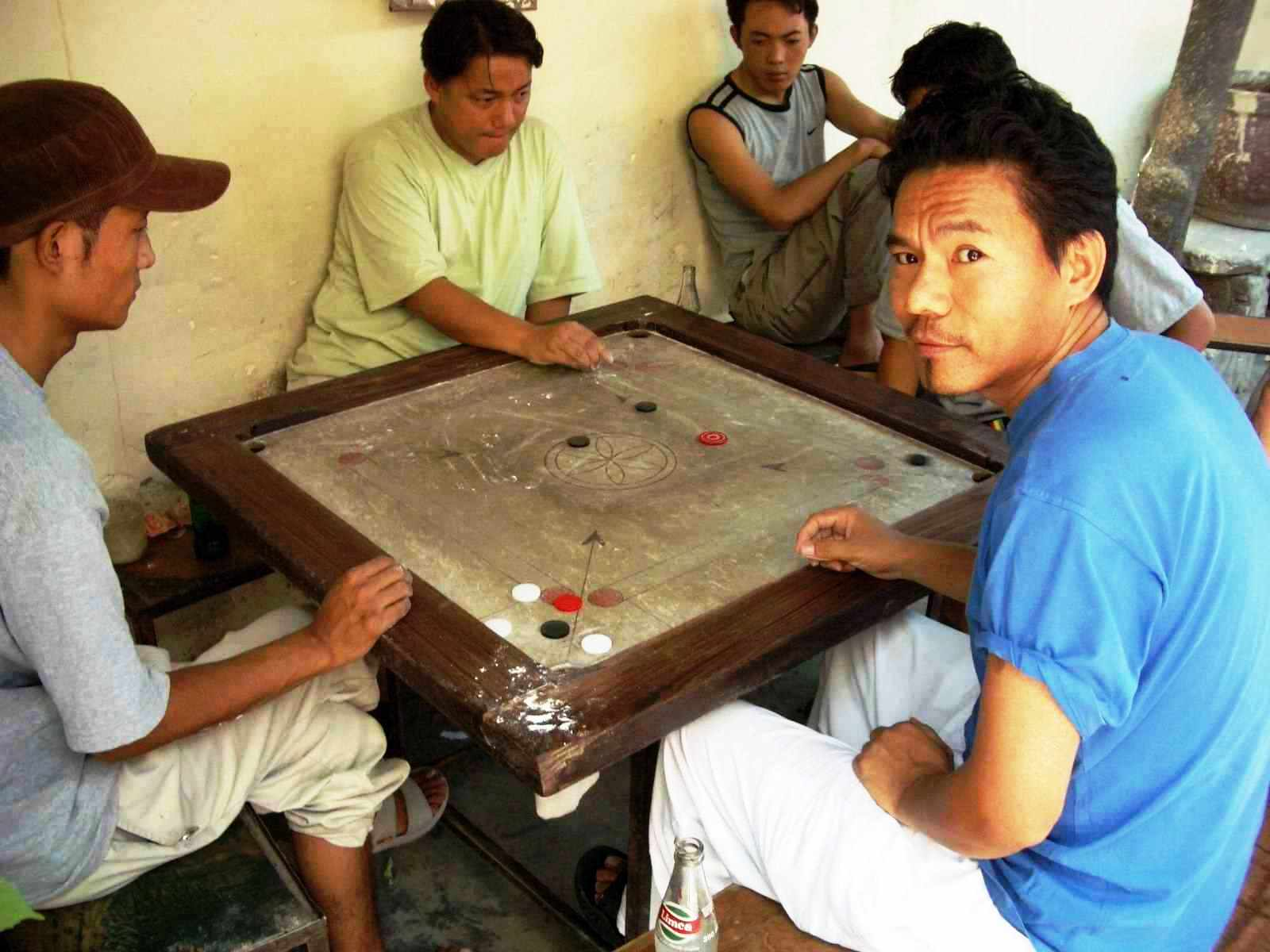
Tibetans playing carrom in Delhi

Carrom is a tabletop game of Indian origin in which players flip or flick discs, attempting to knock them to the corners of the board, in a similar fashion to billiards. Throughout South Asia, many clubs and cafés hold regular carrom tournaments. Carrom is commonly played by families, including children, and at social gatherings. Different standards and rules exist in different areas.

== See also ==
- Sport in South Asia
- South Asian physical culture
- Traditional games of India
- Traditional games of Bangladesh
- Traditional games of Pakistan
- Traditional games of Sri Lanka
- Traditional games of Nepal
- Traditional games of Afghanistan
