= Chhattisgarhiya Olympics =

Annual sports event held in India

- Venue: Balbir Singh Juneja Indoor Stadium, Raipur, Chhattisgarh

The Chhattisgarhiya Olympics (CG Olympics) are an annual sports event held in Chhattisgarh, India to celebrate traditional Indian games such as kabaddi and kho-kho, as well as to promote sports participation among rural people and women. The event takes place over three months. The first edition was held in 2022, with around 2.6 million (mostly rural) Chhattisgarhis participating, and about 1,900 of them reaching the state-level finals. Over 3 million Chhattisgarhis likely participated in the 2023 edition.

== Format ==
There are six ascending levels of competition: village, zonal, development block/urban cluster, district, divisional and state. There are also four age categories: below 18 years old, 18 to 40 years old, 40 to 60 years old, and above 60 years old. Men and women play in separate categories.

In the 2023 edition, competition participants could win anywhere from ₹500 (US$5.90) to ₹5,000 (US$59) depending on how well they finished and at what level of competition.

== Sports ==
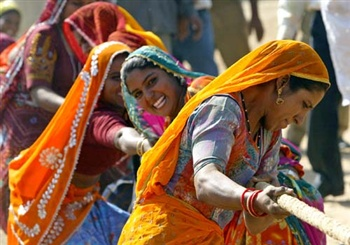
A team of women taking part in tug of war.

The games are split into team and single categories.

Single-category games include:

- Gedi race (racing on bamboo stilts)
- Billas
- Fugdi
- Baati (Marbles)
- Bhaura (Spinning top)
- Long race
- Jumping rope
- Wrestling
- 100-meter race
- Long jump

Team-category games include:

- Pitthul
- Gilli-danda
- Langdi-race
- Sankhali
- Kabaddi
- Kho-kho
- Tug-of-war
- Cart race

== See also ==
- Khelo India
- Pro Kabaddi League
