= Sport in South Asia =

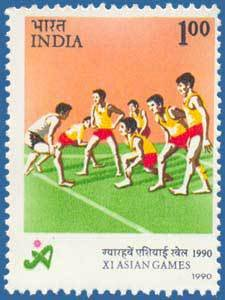
Kabaddi, a native South Asian sport, made its inaugural appearance at the Asian Games in 1990.

Many sports are played in South Asia, with cricket being the most popular of them; 90% of the sport's worldwide fans live in South Asia. Football is followed passionately in some parts of South Asia, such as Kerala and Bengal. Field hockey was popular for several decades, with some of South Asia's greatest sporting accomplishments having taken place in this sport. Some native South Asian games are played professionally in the region, such as kabaddi and kho-kho, and also feature in regional competitions such as the South Asian Games and Asian Games.

== History ==
=== Ancient and medieval era ===
Some martial arts were practiced during this time period, such as kalaripayattu. Several variations of tag were played at the time, with kho-kho having been mentioned in the fourth century BCE, and atya-patya around 300 CE; some of them were used for military training purposes. The board game chaturanga formed the foundation of the modern game of chess, and was also used as strategic training for war; it travelled towards Europe and China under Persian and then Arab influence.

=== Colonial era ===
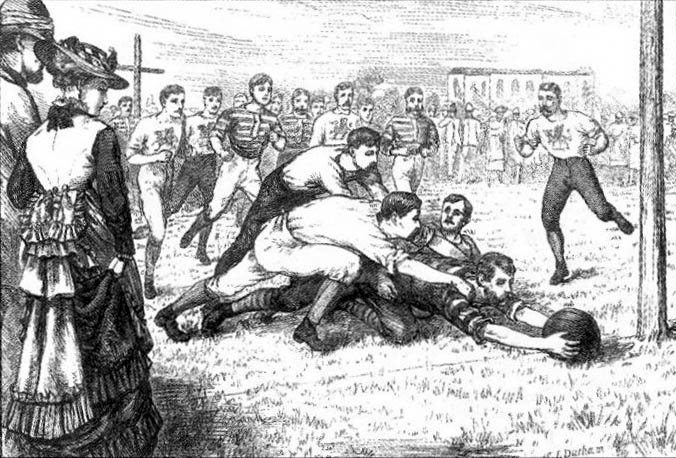
An 1875 painting of rugby being played by Europeans in Kolkata (then known as Calcutta).

British colonisation of South Asia introduced several British sports into the subcontinent, such as cricket, football, and hockey, causing a decline for the local sports, though some of the local sports began to be standardised during this period in Maharashtra. The economic struggles prevailing at the time limited people's overall ability to participate in sport.

Some South Asian board games were transmitted overseas, such as the games now known as ludo and snakes and ladders.

=== Contemporary era ===
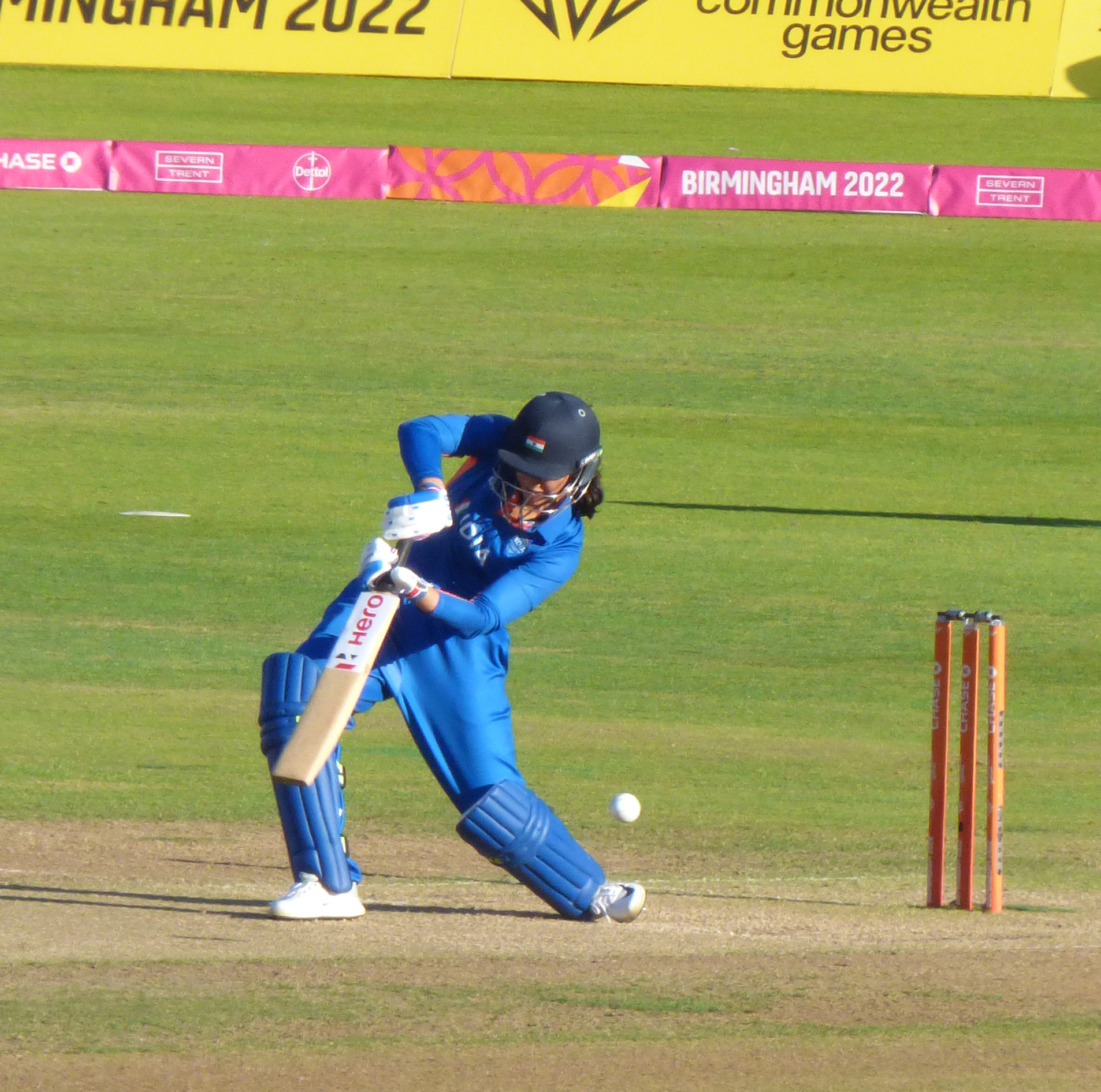
An Indian batter hitting the ball in a women's T20 cricket match at the 2022 Commonwealth Games.

Field hockey was popular for several decades after the colonial era. After India's victory in the 1983 Cricket World Cup, cricket started to grow in the subcontinent while hockey declined, with the 1975 switch from grass to astroturf fields often cited as making hockey too expensive. The introduction of Twenty20 cricket, a format that greatly reduced the playing duration, as well as the advent of the Indian Premier League, which made cricket a strong economic force in the region, further grew the popularity of the sport. Cricket also grew in Afghanistan with the return of refugees who had learned the sport in Pakistan.

The poverty of South Asia has continued to be a defining factor in limiting the success of sport in the region; until the 1970s, for example, cricket and football were not prevalent because of the expensiveness of buying balls.

One of the most important sports rivalries within the subcontinent is the India–Pakistan sports rivalry, due to the history of conflict between the two nations after their partition in 1947.

Various traditional sports have had professional leagues started for them in the 21st century (largely propelled by the economic liberalisation of the 1990s that took place in India that increased investing into sports), such as the Pro Kabaddi League, which has significantly grown kabaddi, as well as Ultimate Kho Kho and the Pro Panja League for arm wrestling. Kabaddi in particular has begun to spread globally, with non-South Asian countries becoming successful at the sport. The growth of these traditional sports has been aided by changes to their appearance and rule sets, such as a shift from playing on mud surfaces to matted surfaces. Some national and sub-national initiatives have also been undertaken to promote sports, such as Khelo India and the Chhattisgarhiya Olympics.

Women's sports have grown in South Asia with the advent of women's sporting leagues such as the Women's Kabaddi League and the Women's Premier League (cricket).

== Competitions ==
=== Major sporting leagues or competitions ===
Game	Competition
Arm wrestling (panja)	Pro Panja League
Athletics	South Asian U20 Athletics Championships
Auto racing	Indian National Rally Championship
Auto racing	JK Tyre National Racing Championship
Badminton	Premier Badminton League
Badminton	India Open
Badminton	Syed Modi International Badminton Championships
Badminton	Odisha Open
Badminton	India International Challenge
Basketball	Elite Pro Basketball League
Basketball	3x3 Pro Basketball League
Basketball	INBL
Boxing	Super Boxing League
Cricket	Ranji Trophy
Cricket	Irani Cup
Cricket	Vijay Hazare Trophy
Cricket	Duleep Trophy
Cricket	Indian Premier League Syed Mushtaq Ali Trophy
Cricket	Bangladesh Premier League
Cricket	Pakistan Super League
Cycling	International Cycling League
Cycling	Pro Cycle Cycling
Field hockey	Hockey India League
Football	Indian Super League
Football	Bangladesh Premier League (football)
Football	I-League
Football	I-League 2
Football	I-League 3
Football	Indian Women's League
Football	Indian Women's League 2
Football	State football leagues
Football	Club cup tournaments (Super Cup, Durand Cup, IFA Shield etc.)
Football	Inter state association tournaments (Santosh Trophy, Senior Women's NFC etc.)
Futsal	Futsal Club Championship
Golf	Professional Golf Tour of India
Golf	Indian Open (golf)
Golf	Women's Indian Open
Handball	Premier Handball League
Ice Hockey	Indian Ice Hockey Championship
Kabaddi	Pro Kabaddi League
Kabaddi	Super Kabaddi League
Kho-kho	Ultimate Kho Kho
Mixed martial arts	Matrix Fight Night
Roller hockey (quad)	Indian Roller Hockey National Championship
Rugby Union	All India & South Asia Rugby Tournament
Squash (sport)	National Squash Championship
Table Tennis	Ultimate Table Tennis
Table Tennis	India Open (table tennis)
Tennis	Maharashtra Open
Volleyball	Prime Volleyball League
Wrestling	Pro Wrestling League

== See also ==
=== By nation ===
- Sport in India
- Sport in Bangladesh
- Sport in Pakistan
- Sport in Sri Lanka
- Sport in Nepal

=== Other topics ===
- South Asia Olympic Council
- South Asian Football Federation
- South Asian Games
