= Paandi =

Recreational game played in India and Sri Lanka

Paandi, also known as Pandi or Nondi, is a regional hopscotch game traditionally played in rural parts of India (such as Tamil Nadu), Sri Lanka and also in certain other countries with large numbers of immigrant Indians. The game is played only for leisure and does not involve serious rules or regulations. It is also called as Tokkudu Billa or Tangidi Billa in Andhra Pradesh and Kunte Bille in Karnataka

== History ==
The exact time period pin pointing the origin of the game cannot be established since it is a part of Folklore games. However, it is believed to be in existence from very early centuries even being mentioned in ancient Tamil literatures.we can pronounce it as by Nondi (நொண்டி).

== Playing conditions ==
Any land surface without any potholes and other serious damages (which may potentially harm a player) can be used as a field. Generally, it is played on evenings where there is little breeze and players can be free from the scorching sun prevalent in the tropical region where the game is mostly played. Although, rainy season makes playing area damp and potential injury to the players, it is not hindrance to those who are really interested in this game. A small piece of stone, usually a Rubble is all that is needed for playing the game.

== Rules and scoring ==
Usually, a series of boxes that are connected with each other is drawn with the first three boxes being single followed by two connected boxes and one single box, with the last two boxes connected. The boxes look like a series of three boxes stacked on top of each other (The Top Section), which is stacked on two boxes placed touching each other that are stacked on a single box (The Middle Section) which are stacked on the bottom section of two touching boxes (The Bottom Section). The person to pass through each boxes through hopping and walking with eyes closed without touching the borders is the winner. There are different levels the player has to pass through in order to become the ultimate winner.

Usually a group of players of up to 4 players (although there can be any number of players involved) decides by playing Saa-boo-Three on who should start first. The first player throws the rubble in the 1st box, without touching the corners and has to hop directly from the start line to Box 2 without touching the first box and has to hop from Box 2 to Box 8, not spending more than 10 seconds in each box and has to repeat the process in reverse, where he collects the rubble in the first box only with one hand and jumping straight to the starting point. the person who does this step without any fumbles is eligible to the next box. This time the rubble has to be thrown at the 2nd Box and repeat the process again but he is allowed to hop on Box 1 and stay as long as he wants (although most won't take more 15 seconds) as he has conquered that box. The Process goes on until he conquers all eight boxes. However, a person is out if he touches edges of any box in his attempt or he throws the rubble in other boxes than the one which he is supposed to throw. The Players take turn until a winner is emerged. There is high possibility for a person to win without other players getting turn.

== Ultimate Paandi ==
This is a version of Paandi whereby players hop through the boxes with their eyes closed or blinded.

== Recreation ==
This sport is mainly played for leisure and as a pastime. The sport is now losing its sheen with children shifting their interests in playing video games and other street games such as cricket.

== See also ==
- Chindro
- Langdi (sport)
