= Traditional games of Nepal =

Nepal has many traditional games that are similar to other traditional South Asian games. Many of these games were played during local cultural festivals, but are now disappearing because of technological influence and globalisation.

== History ==
Dandi biyo and kabaddi, which were considered the unofficial national sports until recently, are still popular in rural areas. Despite efforts, standardisation and development of dandi biyo has not been achieved, while kabaddi, as a professional sport, is still in its infancy in Nepal. Bagh-chal, an ancient board game that is thought to have originated in Nepal, can be played on chalk-drawn boards, with pebbles, and is still popular today. Ludo, snakes and ladders and carrom are popular pastimes. Chess is also played. Volleyball was declared as the national sport of Nepal in 2017. Popular children's games include versions of tag, knucklebones, hopscotch, Duck, duck, goose and lagori, while marbles, top, hoop rolling and gully cricket are also popular among boys. Rubber bands, or ranger bands cut from tubes in bike tyres, make a multi-purpose sporting equipment for Nepali children, which may be bunched or chained together, and used to play dodgeball, cat's cradle, jianzi and a variety of skipping rope games.

== Traditional games ==
=== Dandi biyo ===
Dandi biyo (Nepali: डन्डी बियो, pronounced [ˈɖʌɳɖi ˈbijo]) is a game played in Nepal which was considered the de facto national game until 23 May 2017, when volleyball was declared as the national sport. Dandi biyo is played with a stick (dandi) about 2 feet (61 cm) long and a wooden pin (biyo) about 6 inches (15 cm) long. The pin is a small wooden stick with pointed ends. The game is similar to the Indian game gilli danda. The government has not implemented any policies for the preservation of dandi biyo, and with decreasing players the game is expected to be extinct soon.

=== Guccha ===
This game (also known as marbles) involves participants flicking marbles with their fingers in the hopes of pushing opponents' marbles outside of the playing area.

=== Bhurung ===
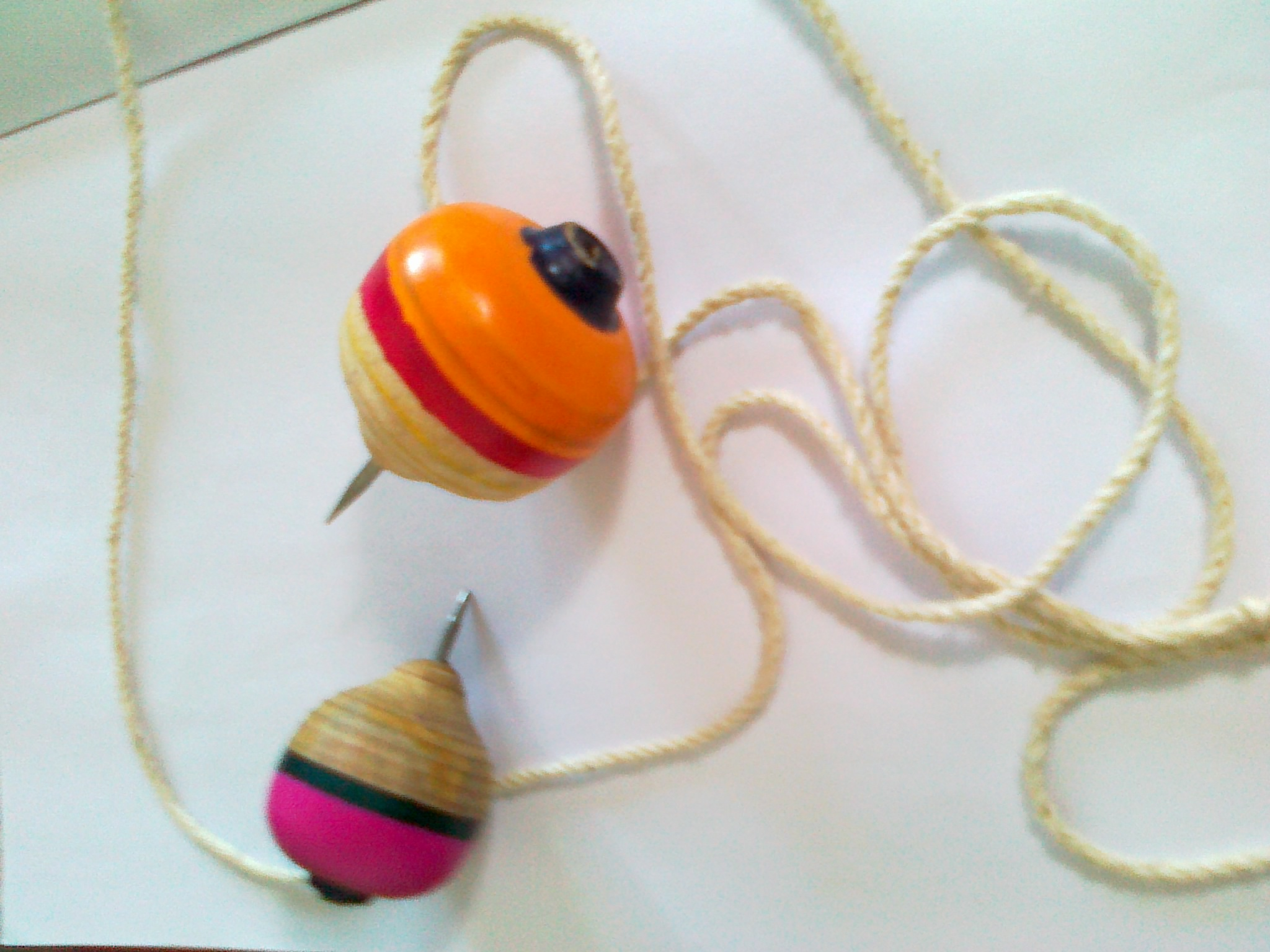
Pambaram (throwing top)

Pambaram (Tamil: பம்பரம், Malayalam: പമ്പരം), also called the Lattu (Urdu: لٹو), Latim (Bengali: লাটিম), Lattoo (Bhojpuri: 𑂪𑂗𑂹𑂗𑂴) Bhawra (Marathi: भावरा), Buguri (Kannada: ಬುಗುರಿ), or Bongaram (Telugu: బొంగరం), is a traditional throwing top mainly played in India and Bangladesh.

In Nepal, the spinning top is known as a bhurung or lattu.

=== Dhyakki ===
Dhyakki (or piya) is a form of hopscotch in which players must move a rock across the playing area as they hop through it.

== Ball games ==
=== Chungi ===
Chungi (Nepali: चुङ्गि) is a traditional game played by children in Nepal and northeastern India. The setup of the game is similar to hacky sack. It is played with a ball made by tying a group of rubber bands in the middle.

=== Seven stones ===
Seven stones (also known by various other names) is a traditional game from the Indian subcontinent involving a ball and a pile of flat stones, generally played between two teams in a large outdoor area.

Though this game goes by other names in neighboring countries, it is primarily known in Nepal as seven stones.

== Variations of tag ==
=== Kabaddi ===
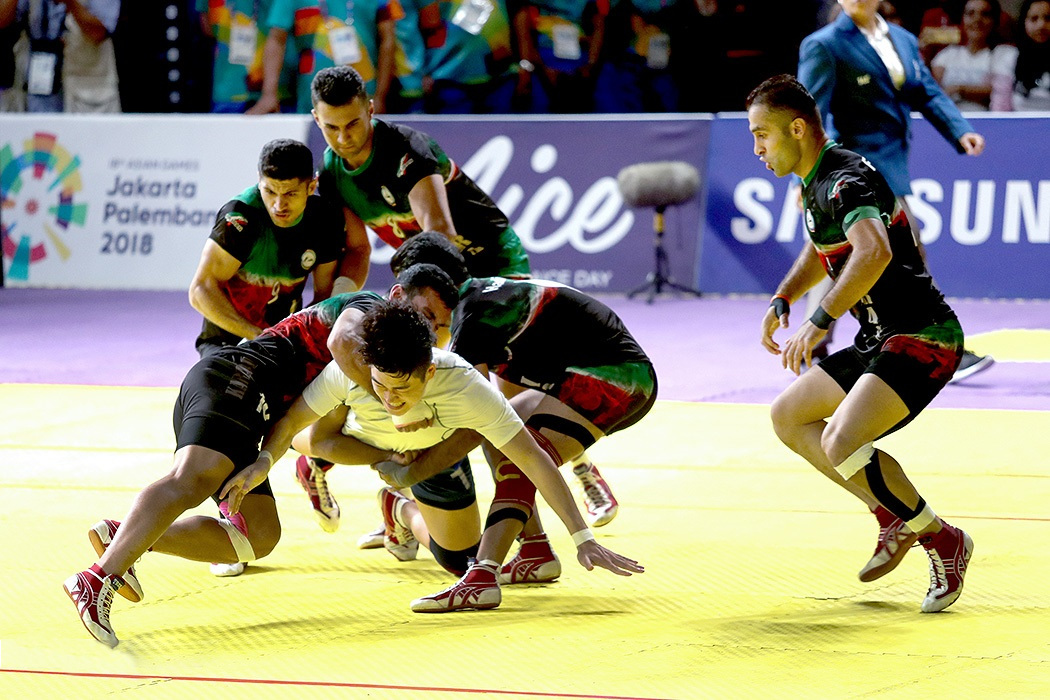
Kabaddi being played at the 2018 Asian Games

Kabaddi (/kəˈbædi/, /ˈkʌbədi/) is a contact team sport played between two teams of seven players. It is one of the traditional games of South Asia. In the game, a raider enters the opposing half of the court to tag the defenders and attempt to return within 30 seconds without being tackled. Points are awarded for successful tags, while defenders earn a point for tackling the raider. Tagged or tackled players are temporarily out but can re-enter when their team scores. Raids alternate between teams throughout the game.

Kabaddi (also known locally as kapardi) has been declining in Nepal in recent decades.

=== Kho kho ===
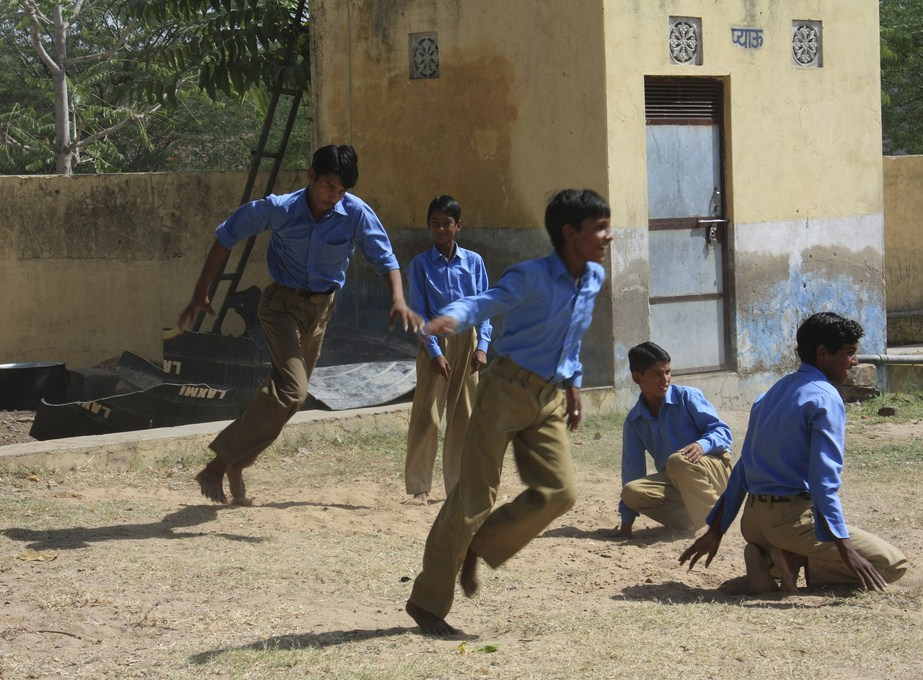
A game of kho kho at a government school in India

Kho kho is a traditional Indian sport that dates to ancient India. It is one of the most popular traditional tag games in the Indian subcontinent after kabaddi. Kho kho is played on a rectangular court with a central lane connecting two poles at either end of the court. During the game, nine players from the chasing team (attacking team) are on the field, with eight of them sitting (crouched) in the central lane, while three runners from the defending team run around the court and try to avoid being touched or caught. Each sitting player on the chasing team faces the opposite half of the field.

The Nepal Kho Kho Association was established the late 1990s, and the sport is contested at the country's National Games. Nepal finished as runner-ups in the inaugural 2025 Kho Kho World Cup.

== Board games ==
=== Bagh-chal ===
Bagh-chal (Nepali: बाघ चाल bāgh cāl, Newar: धुँ कासा dhun kasa meaning "tiger game") is a strategic, two-player board game that originated in Nepal. The game is asymmetric in that one player controls four tigers and the other player controls up to twenty goats. The tigers 'hunt' the goats while the goats attempt to block the tigers' movements. This game is also seen in southern India with a different board, but the rules are the same. This game is popular in rural areas of the country.

== Animal events ==
=== Elephant polo ===
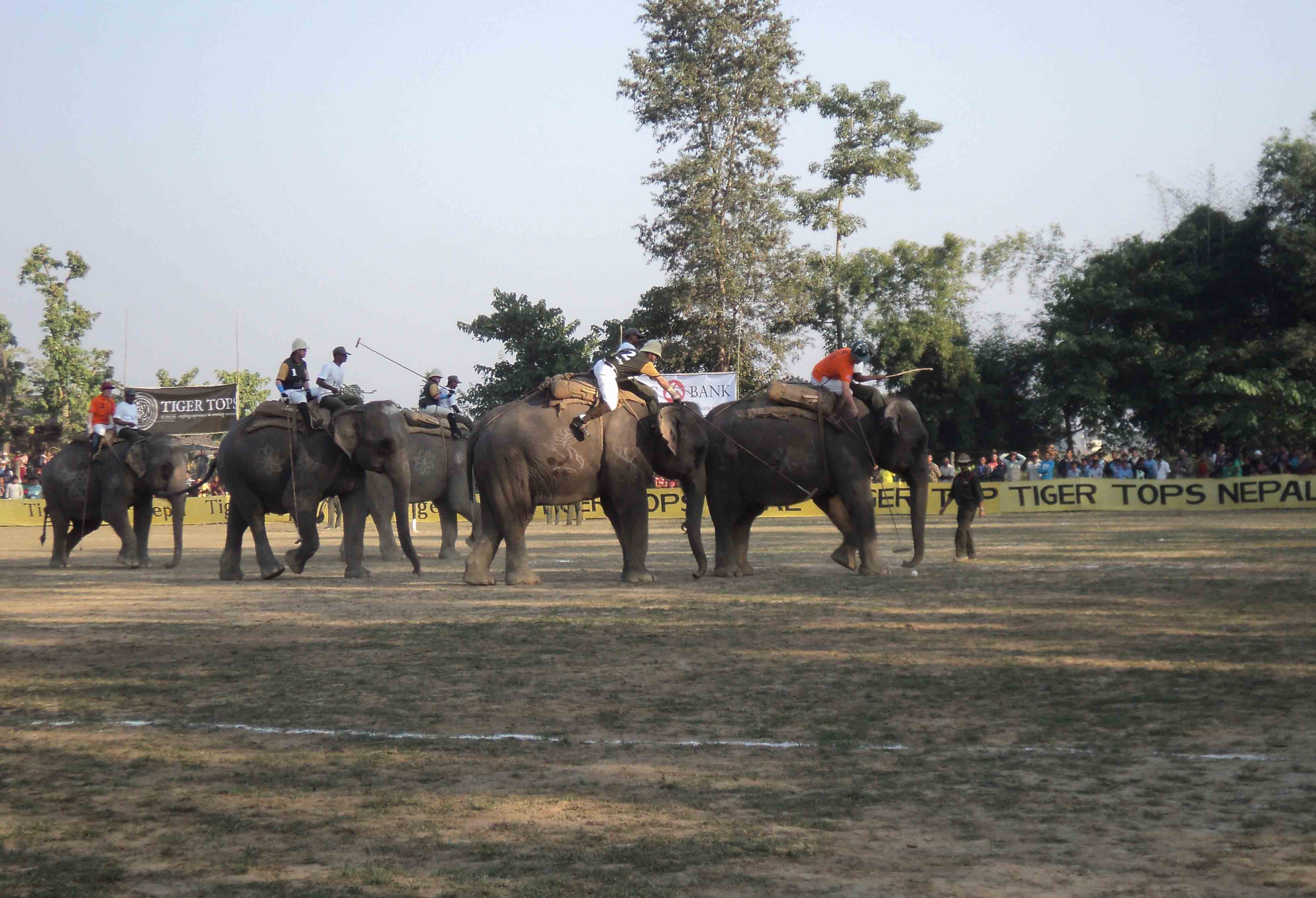
Elephant Polo World Cup 2012, Meghauli, Nepal

Elephant polo is a variant of polo played while riding elephants. It is played in Nepal, and Thailand. England and Scotland regularly field teams. Equipment consists of a standard polo ball and a 1.8 metres (5.9 ft) to 3 metres (9.8 ft) cane (similar to bamboo) sticks with a polo mallet head on the end. The pitch is three-quarters of the length of a standard polo pitch, due to the lower speed of the elephants. Two people ride each elephant; the elephants are steered by mahouts, while the player tells the mahout which way to go and hits the ball.
