= Oonch Neech =

Children's game

Oonch Neech (or Oonch Neech ka Papada) is a rural and urban street children's game and variation of tag played in North India and Pakistan. Oonch Neech (Hindi) translates to Up and Down in English.

In Andhra Pradesh, the game is called Nela Banda, (Telugu: నేల-బండ) which is now extinct owing to urbanization and western influence. This game needs at least 4 or more players.

In Maharashtra, it is known as Dagad ka Maati (Marathi: दगड़ का माती) literally meaning "Stone or Sand"

In Oonch Neech if the denner (tagger) says neech (down), all players have to go to an elevated area. If he says oonch (up) then all players have to stay down. Whatever the denner picks, he has to stay on that platform.

== Terms ==
Oonch means an area higher than ground level or simply Upper Level. Neech means the ground area or the lower surface area or simply Lower Level. The denner is the person who catches the other players.

== Gameplay ==
To start one person, say A, is chosen as denner. The players ask the denner : 'Oonch neech ka papada—Oonch mangi ki neech?' meaning "do you want the upper level or the lower level?" The catcher chooses either Oonch (any height) or Neech (ground). Usually he chooses Neech, so as to move. Once A chooses Oonch, he cannot step on Neech and does not let other players step there. If B stays on the ground by mistake and is captured by A, then B becomes the denner in the next round.

The other players tease the denner by saying hum tumhari Neech pe or hum tumhari oonch pe which means "We're in your area, catch us". In Telugu, it is translated as nee nelanta pappu suddha or nee bandanta pappu suddha. The denner is asked by the players "Which area do you want? Oonch (up) or Neech (down)?".

In Marathi while giving the choice to the denner, the players recite the following poem:

Kora Kagad Nili Shai, A
Konhala Bhit Nahi
Sanga Tumcha Nav kay
Dagad Ka Maati?

In Devanagri:

कोरा कागद नीली शाई, अम्ही कुनला भेत नाही।
सांगा तुमच नाव काय, दगड की माती?

== In popular culture ==
The eponymous 1989 Bollywood film, Oonch Neech Beech (1989), starred Sanjeev Kumar and Shabana Azmi.

== See also ==
- Stapu
