= Chindro =

Children's game

Chindro (also known as Stapoo or Kidi Kada) is a game popular in the Indian subcontinent. The game is played with a stone that is tossed or slid on a marked-off playing court. It is similar to hopscotch.

== Equipment and setup ==
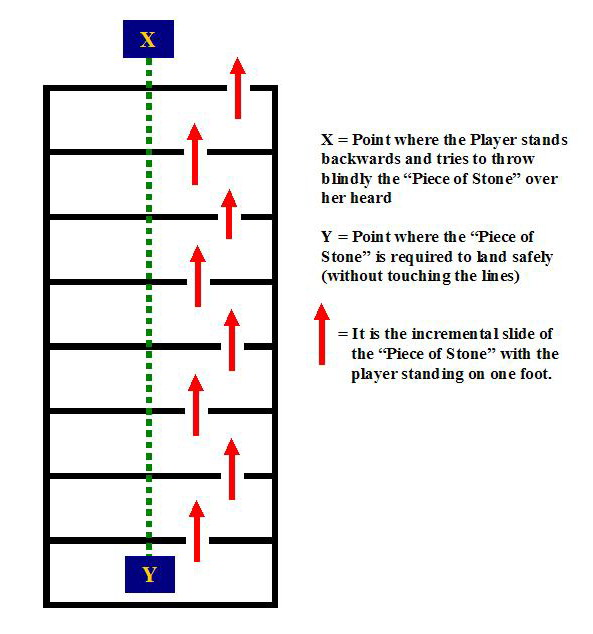
Diagram of Chindro playing court and motion of gameplay.

The game requires a small piece of chalk or coal to draw a playing court and a square or round piece of flat stone (usually not bigger than 4 inches (10 cm) in diameter) as the tossing object. Sometimes, an empty small metal box, say of shoe polish, is filled with sand and is used as the tossing object.

One of the participants draws a playing court on a flat surface (usually the floor of alleys) with the help of a piece of coal or chalk. The size of the court depends upon the wishes of the participants and may thus vary greatly. For example, if all the participants agree to have a court of eight boxes 2 by 4 feet (0.61 by 1.22 m) each, then that constitutes the playing court.

== Gameplay ==
Once the playing court is drawn, each participant takes turns. Initially, the player stands backwards at one side of the court and throws the stone blindly over her head so that it may land inside the furthest box of the court. If it lands successfully inside the designated box (without touching any lines) of the court, the player takes off her shoes and stands barefoot near that piece of stone with one foot in the air. Afterwards, she pushes the stone (in a single try) to attempt to slide it into the adjoining box. If successful (once again without touching any of the lines), then the player carries on doing the same until the piece of stone is successfully out of the court and the player is back at the place from where she threw the stone. Once successfully out of the court, the player may stand on both feet.

Consequently, the player's turn prematurely ends when:

- The player can no longer stand on one foot and both feet touch the court area, or
- The stone stops on one of the lines, or
- The stone slides out of the court before it reaches the last box.

== Taliban ban ==
During the Taliban's rule, many sports for girls were banned in Afghanistan, including Chindro.

== See also ==
- Paandi
- Langdi (sport)
