= Traditional games of Afghanistan =

The nation of Afghanistan has various traditional games and sports.

== Traditional games ==
=== Archery ===
Archery has been a popular game among the various ethnic groups of Afghanistan.

=== Barfi ===
This game is played during the time of year when the first snow falls. One person sends a messenger to another person's home, and if the recipient of the message fails to catch the messenger before the messenger can return home, then the recipient must pay for a large meal for the sender of the message; otherwise, the message-sender pays.

=== Bujal bazi ===
Bujal bazi, known as Bejali in some parts of the country, is a marble game played by children with sheep knucklebones.

=== Gudiparan bazi ===
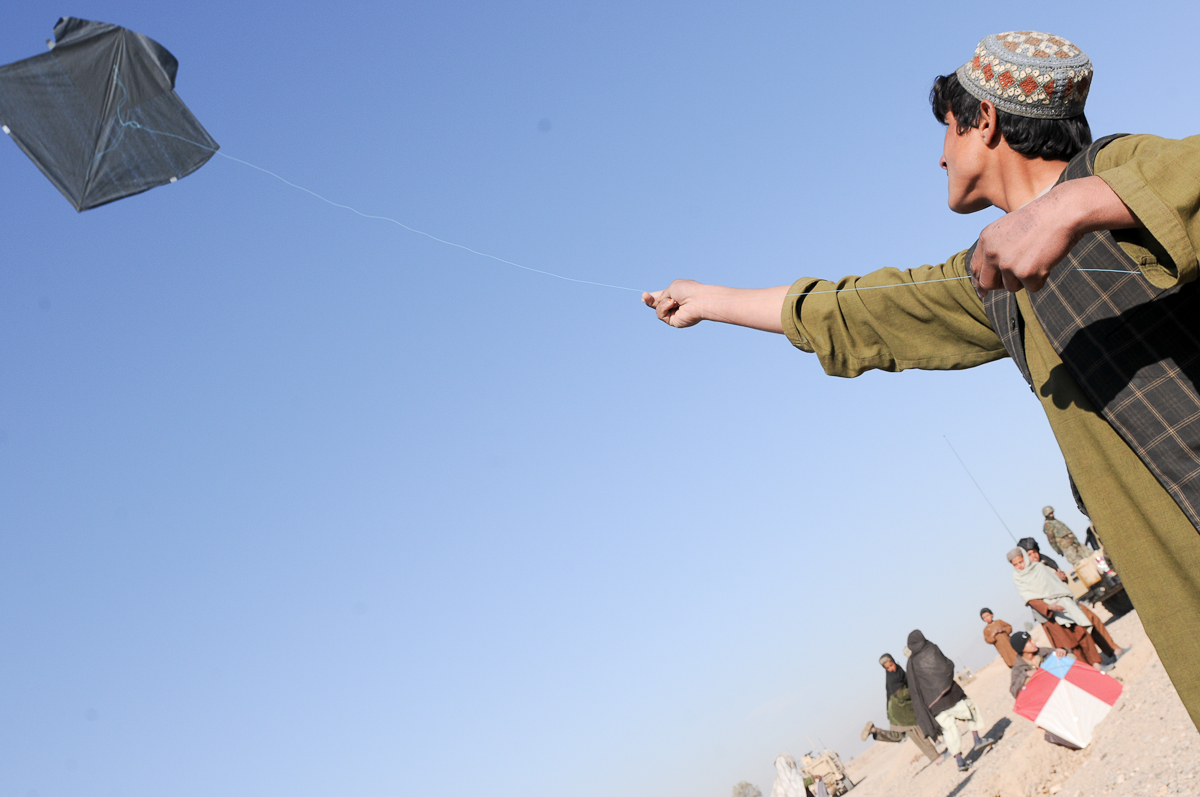
Young man flying a kite

Gudiparan bazi in Dari or kaghazbad in Pashto are some of the local names for kite fighting and kite running in Afghanistan. It has been going on in the country for over 100 years.

=== Khusai ===
In the game of khusai (pronounced as ghorsai in Persian), two teams attempt to pass each other to the other team's goal line, while preventing the other team from doing the same. The game requires hopping on one foot in order to knock opponents down.

=== Sangi rag ===
Two teams of four to five players compete by throwing stones at a target; each player gets 10 throws, and the player that throws the closest to the target in a given round wins that round. Hitting the target directly earns twice as many points. The team that reaches 10 points first wins.

=== Tokhm-jangi ===
During certain public holidays such as Eid al-Fitr, participants in this game paint hard-boiled eggs and then bump them against other participants' eggs in order to break the other eggs.

== Board games ==
=== Carrom ===
The game of carrom is played in many Afghan homes, including in public parks.

=== Chaka ===
Chaka is the local name for Ludo board game in Afghanistan.

=== Satranj ===
Satranj is the local name for chess in Afghanistan.

== Wrestling ==
=== Koresh ===
Koresh, also known as chepanki wrestling, is a form of belt wrestling.

=== Pahlawani ===
Pahlawani is a form of wrestling contested over four rounds, in which each round is won by the participant who can flip their opponent onto their back.

== Animal events ==
=== Buzkashi ===
Buzkashi (Persian: بزکشی, lit. 'goat pulling') is the most favored sport of Afghanistan. It is a traditional sport in which horse-mounted players attempt to place a goat or calf carcass in a goal. Similar games are known as kokpar, kupkari, and ulak tartysh in Uzbekistan and Kazakhstan.

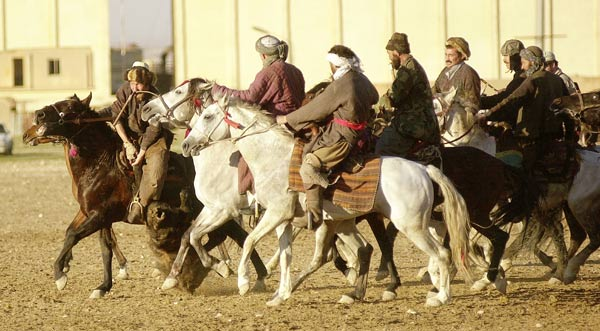
Game of buzkashi in Mazar-i-Sharif, Afghanistan

=== Tent pegging ===
Tent pegging (sometimes spelled tent-pegging or tentpegging) is a cavalry sport of ancient origin, and is one of only ten equestrian disciplines officially recognised by the International Equestrian Federation. Used narrowly, the term refers to a specific mounted game with ground targets. More broadly, it refers to the entire class of mounted cavalry games involving pointed and edged weapons (lance and sword) on horseback, for which the term "equestrian skill-at-arms" is also used.

== See also ==
- Culture of Afghanistan
- Sport in Afghanistan
- Traditional games of South Asia
