= Tokkudu Billa =

Tokkudu Billa (Telugu:తొక్కుడుబిళ్ళ లేక తంగిడి బిళ్ళ) is a type of Hopscotch played by girls in rural villages of Andhra Pradesh and Telangana. It is also played as Kunte Bille in Karnataka. Girls play this recreational sport by hopping on the squares. Currently this popular outdoor game is vanishing due to literacy, urbanization and the influence of Western games.

== Objective ==
Capture maximum number of boxes by hopping, and by using a coin.

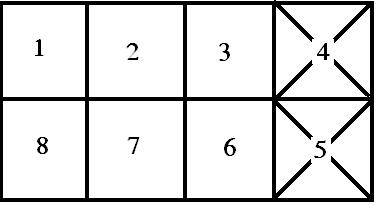
TokkuduBilla

== How to Play ==
To win each square, the following phases have to be followed.

- Phase 1:
- 1. Stand outside of the grid and drop the coin on 8
- 2. Starting from 1, hop until 7 to pick up the coin in 8 while in hopping position.
- 3. Cast the coin out of the grid (not too far) and jump on it
- 4. Now throw the coin in the box 7
- 5. Hop starting from 1 unto 6
- 6. Standing in hopping position in 6, pick up the coin placed in 7
- 7. Hop over the box 7, directly from the box 6 into the box 8 and then hop out of the grid
- 8. Repeat the above similar steps from 4 to 7 with the coin thrown in the boxes 6, 3, 2 and 1 respectively
- Phase 2:
- 1. Put the coin in your palm opened
- 2. Hop, starting from 1 to 8
- 3. Cast the coin out of the grid (not too far) and jump on the coin
- 4. Repeat the steps 5, 6 and 7 with the coin on your palm inverted.
- Phase 3
- 5. Ask the opponents for "Kaya"(raw fruit) or "pandu" (ripen fruit)
- 6. If the opponents choose Kaya, sit down with your back facing the grid, and throw the coin in the grid
- 7. If the opponents choose Pandu, stand, facing your back to the grid and do as in 10.
- 8. Hop into the square bordering with the square in which the coin is placed. Pick up the coin and draw a cross in the bordering square, indicating that you have captured a square. You can also rest your feet in it.
- In all the above phases, you can rest your both legs in 4 and 5 and in the boxes that you have captured. Do not step on the square in which the coin is placed, but hop over it. Other players follow the same steps as above, except that they are not allowed to land on your won boxes. The winner is the player who captures maximum number of boxes in the grid.

Chance losing conditions:

- The player has to wait for her turn if a chance is lost.
- The player loses a chance in the game if :
- 1. The coin falls on the lines or in the crossed boxes or out of the grid
- 2.She steps on the square in which the coin is placed
- 3.She lands on the crossed boxes that are won by others
