= Langdi (sport) =

Traditional Indian tag sport

External videos
- Zee 24 Taas video, Langdi all set to go international.
- SemiNAL-final match of the fourth National Langdi Championship, played between Punjab and Karnataka, Punjab defending and Karnataka chasing, video at the Langdi Federation of India website.

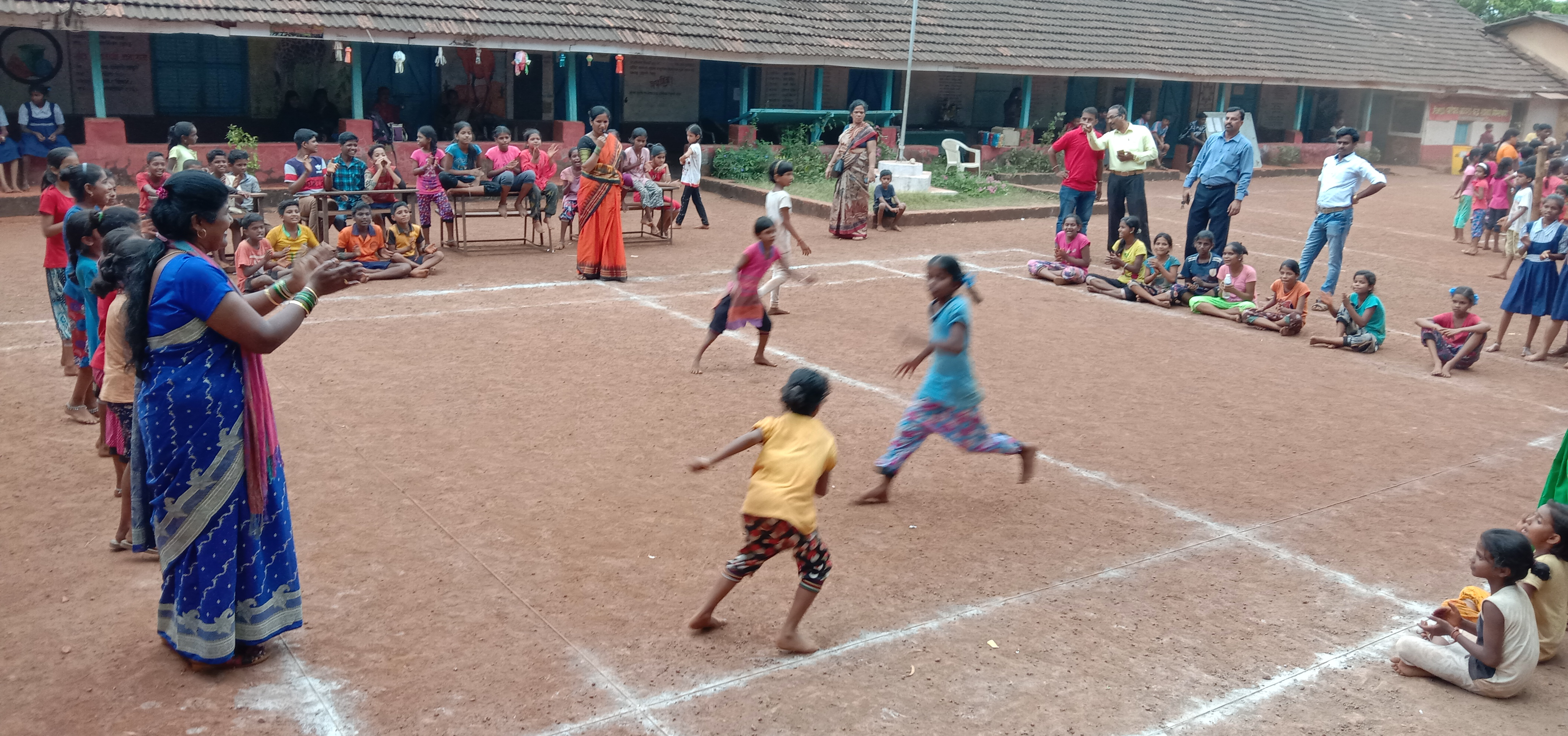
School kids play langdi during a inter-school competition

Langdi (Note: (Hindi: लंगड़ी) Also sometimes spelled Langadi.) is a traditional South Asian field sport which combines elements of tag and hopscotch. It was originally played during the Pandiyan Dynasty and called "Nondiyaattam" at that time. The teams alternate chasing (attacking) and defending roles in each of the 4 innings of the game, with the chasing team's players restricted to hopping around on one foot, and attempting to score points by tagging as many defenders as possible within the 9 minutes of each inning. It is described by Marathis as a sport with a Marathi ethos.

Langdi is considered to be useful in training for sports like kho kho, volleyball and gymnastics. The National Langdi Federation received national recognition in 2010.

Langdi in Maharashtra is a popular childhood pastime, it is described as the foundation of all sports. Suresh Gandhi, Secretary of Langdi Federation of India acknowledges playing langdi isn't financially rewarding. Stake holders have to arrange for funds out of their own resources. Mumbai University will be the first Indian university to introduce langdi at the college level, for female students thus revitalising the traditional sport. 5 lakh female students study in the university in 700 colleges affiliated to it. C. N. Vidyamandir, a school in Ahmedabad, encourages participation in traditional sports such as langdi as these cost less money to play and are mentally and physically refreshing for children addicted to the electronic media and games. According to Mahesh Vichare writing in Maharashtra Times, English medium schools, both secular and those run by Christian institutions, in Mumbai, tend to neglect traditional sports like langdi. Chauhan, national president of Krida Bharati, has stressed that the organisation would endeavour to revitalise traditional sports like langdi in order to create healthy youngsters. Krida bharati is an organisation that promotes sport in India. According to Arun Deshmukh, recognition from the Indian Olympic Association is in the pipeline. This recognition results in facilities like concessional railway travel being made available, thus ensuring in growth of the sport.

Expatriate Indians have associated in the effort to popularise langdi in other countries, such as Thailand. Video films of the sport being played have been prepared in order raise interest internationally.

== Names ==
Langdi is also known as langdi tang.

== Rules ==
The rules of this sport have been standardised by the Akhil Maharashtra Sharirik Shikshan Mandal. The field is a maximum size of 18 metres (59 ft) by 18 metres (59 ft), with the main playing area being a square of about 10 metres (33 ft) on each side.

Langdi is a team sport played between two sides, with 12 players per side, plus three substitutes. A match lasts 36 minutes and consists of four nine-minute innings. The teams alternate the chasing and defending roles each inning. The team that wins a coin toss before the game begins in the defending role. The chasing team sends chasers who hop on one foot and try to tag the defenders. The chasers can step out of the ground as long as they keep on one foot. The defenders are declared out if they step out of the ground or commit a line fault. Once all defenders in the field are tagged, a new set of defenders enter the field from a designated entry zone, with the chaser required to go to the other half of the field before tagging the new defenders. If the chaser fails to remain on one foot, then they leave the field and are replaced by a teammate. During the first turn that a team chases, their chasers must hop on their right foot, and then in their next chasing turn they must all hop on their left foot. The team that tags the most defenders is declared the winner.

== Variations ==
=== House variation ===
In this variation of langdi, the chaser starts off alone attempting to tag all other players. One quadrant of the field is deemed to be the chaser's "house", in which the chaser may move using both feet. Once a player is tagged, they become a chaser themselves as part of a team with the first chaser. Once all players have been tagged, the game restarts, with the last player that was tagged becoming the chaser for the next round.

== Competitions ==
=== International Langadi Championship ===
The first-ever International Langadi Championship was held from 5^{th} to 7^{th} May, 2014 in Phuentsholing, Bhutan.

=== Langdi Championship (India) ===
The fourth National Men's and Women's Langdi Championship was held in Chandigarh, in May 2013.

== See also ==
- Kratai Khadeaw, Thai variant
- Atya patya
- Kabaddi
- Langa (game), a Nigerian game also involving hopping
