= Saa Boo Three =

Indian game

Saa-boo-Three is an Indian game of toss used to determine the order of playing in any sport, particularly in singles competitions involving three or more players. Originating from the Indian state of Tamil Nadu it is a hand game designed as a fast simultaneous procedure. used mainly as a fast simultaneous procedure. Saa Boo Three can be played by two or more people. It is more often used as a selection or an elimination method than as a game. It is commonly used to choose roles in the Thief and Police game and in other games like hide-and-seek and touch and out.

== Rules ==
All players generally form a circle. They then stack hands on top of each other's wrists with their wrist on top and shout the words "saa" "boo" "three" in a very loud voice and players can now choose to either keep their hands in the same position or can alter it by turning their palm side to face up. Then, the number of persons with their palm-side is counted and if it adds up to less than the number of people with wrist-side then all players are counted out from the toss and vice versa. Then, the process is carried on until two players are left out. Then another player who has been the third outer comes and says "Who copies me is the outer?" and the third outer will either keep their hands in the same position or can alter it by turning their palm side to face up again and the two persons will also do the same. If one of the sides of their hands is same as the third outer, he gets the chance to play as first or last depending on the situation. If none of the two players hand's side is same as the third outer, they will continue the process until they find out the outer.

=== Variations ===
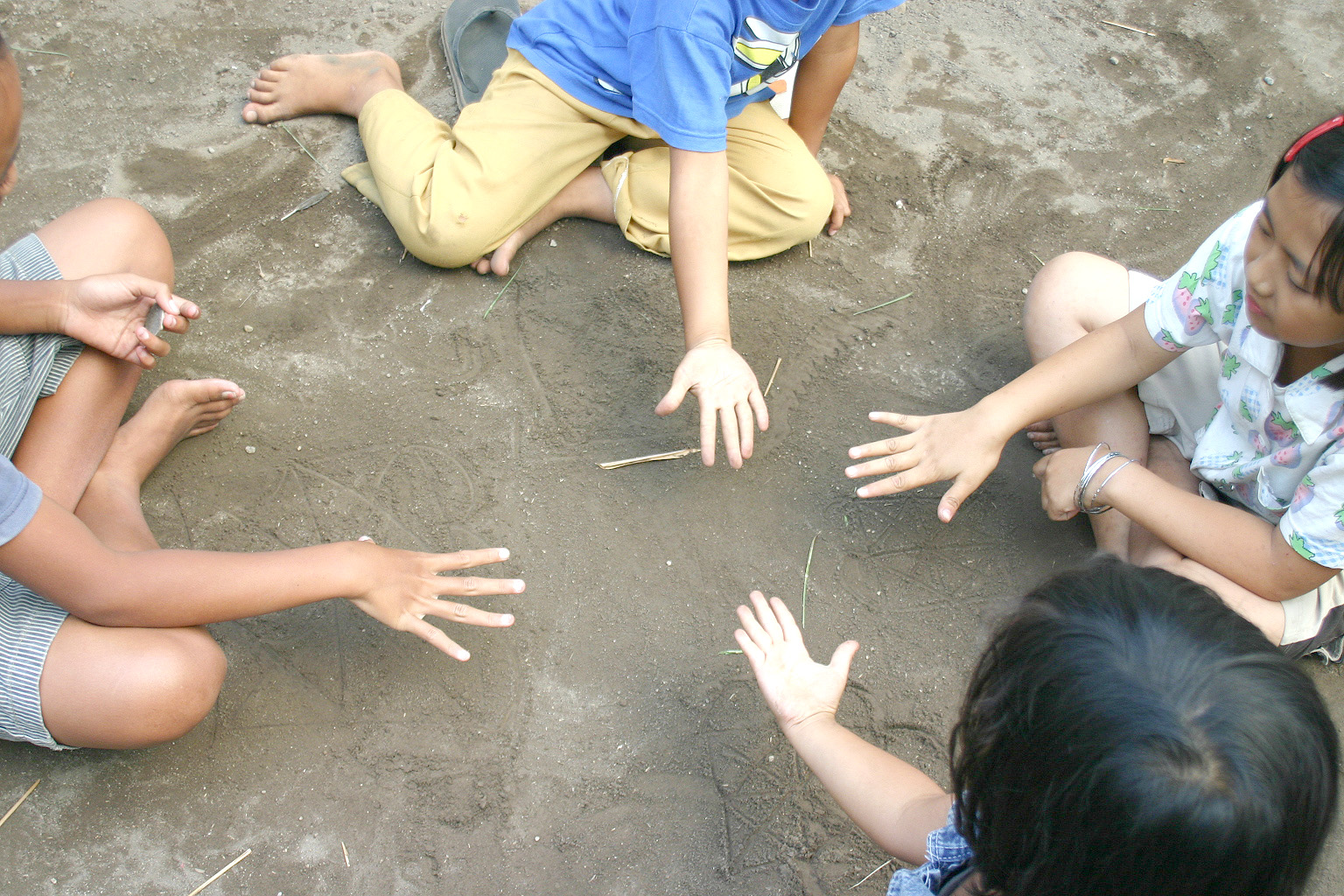
Hompimpa as played by kids in Java, Indonesia

A similar practice is done in the Indian subcontinent known as pugan pugayee or pugam pugai, in which a group of three players is randomly chosen, and they are asked to face one of their hands either up or down; if a player faces their hand in the opposite way of the other two players, they are eliminated, and the process repeats until one of the players in the final group of three faces their hand in the opposite way of the other two players, at which point they are selected as the winner of the process. In China, the same game is called "black and white". In Indonesia, a similar practice is known as hom-pim-pa, which involves a mantra from Sanskrit.

== Advantages ==
This is the cheapest mode of tossing in any sport without causing any misunderstandings among the players. It usually takes less than a minute to perform. It can be particularly useful if a singles competition involves more than 7 people. Though it has been used in team competitions it is popular only with singles competition. This is not only used as selecting a team to play first, but it is also played simply as an interesting game. It is not used by most people to choose the team as they think this is childish. But they do not know the enjoyment of this game. Most of the people prefer tossing. But children usually use this method to play and select the outer.

== See also ==
- Morra#Ones-and-twos
