= Hopscotch =

Playground jumping game

A child playing hopscotch on an unnumbered grid in the United States

Moves in a Hungarian hopscotch (the black dot being the stone, cast and retrieved)

Hopscotch is a playground game popular in many countries around the world. Players toss a small object, sometimes called a piggy or lagger, into numbered triangles or a pattern of rectangles outlined on the ground and then hop or jump through the spaces and retrieve the object. It is a children's game that can be played with several players or alone. Hopscotch is a physical and cognitive workout.

== Court and rules ==
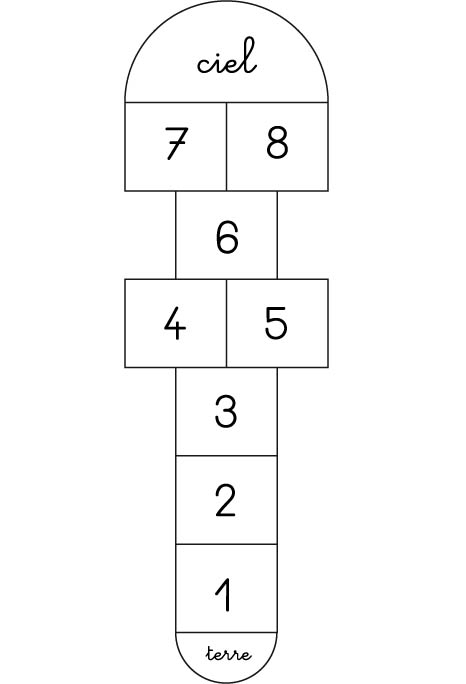
Marelle (French) schoolyard court

Hopscotch courts, c. 1900

English

English (simple)

American

=== The court ===
To play hopscotch, a court is first laid out on the ground. Depending on the available surface, the court is either scratched out in the dirt or drawn with chalk on pavement. Courts may be permanently marked where playgrounds are commonly paved, as in primary schools. Designs vary, but the court is usually composed of a series of linear squares interspersed with blocks of two lateral squares. Traditionally the court ends with a "safe" or "home" base in which the player may turn before completing the reverse trip. The home base may be a square, a rectangle, or a semicircle. The squares are then numbered in the sequence in which they are to be hopped.

=== Playing the game ===
The first player tosses a marker onto the court. The marker (typically a small stone, coin, bean bag, or small chain with a charm) should land in the square without bouncing, sliding, or rolling out. (In Scotland and Ireland, the marker is usually replaced with an old shoe polish tin or flat stone, called a piggy.) In the United States the marker was called a "lagger" and in the 1940s Hopscotch Laggers made of rubber were sold by the Hoppy Taw Company of Utah. The marker must be thrown in sequential numerical order completely within the square without touching the line. The player then hops through the course, skipping the marker's square. Single squares must be hopped on one foot, except for the first single square, where either foot may be used. Side-by-side squares are straddled, with the left foot landing in the left square, and the right foot landing in the right square. Optional squares marked "Safe", "Home", or "Rest" are neutral squares, and may be hopped through in any manner without penalty. After hopping into "Safe", "Home", or "Rest", the player must then turn around and retrace their steps through the course on one or two legs, depending on the square, until reaching the marker's square. The player stops in the square before the marker and reaches down to retrieve the marker and continue the course as stated, without touching a line or stepping into a square with another player's marker.

Upon successfully completing the sequence, the player continues the turn by tossing the marker into square number two, and repeating the pattern.

If, while hopping through the court in either direction, the player steps on a line, misses a square, or loses balance, the turn ends. Players begin their turns where they last left off. The first player to complete one course for every numbered square on the court wins the game.

Although the marker is most often picked up during the game, historically, in the boy's game, the marker was kicked sequentially back through the course on the return trip and then kicked out.

== Origin ==
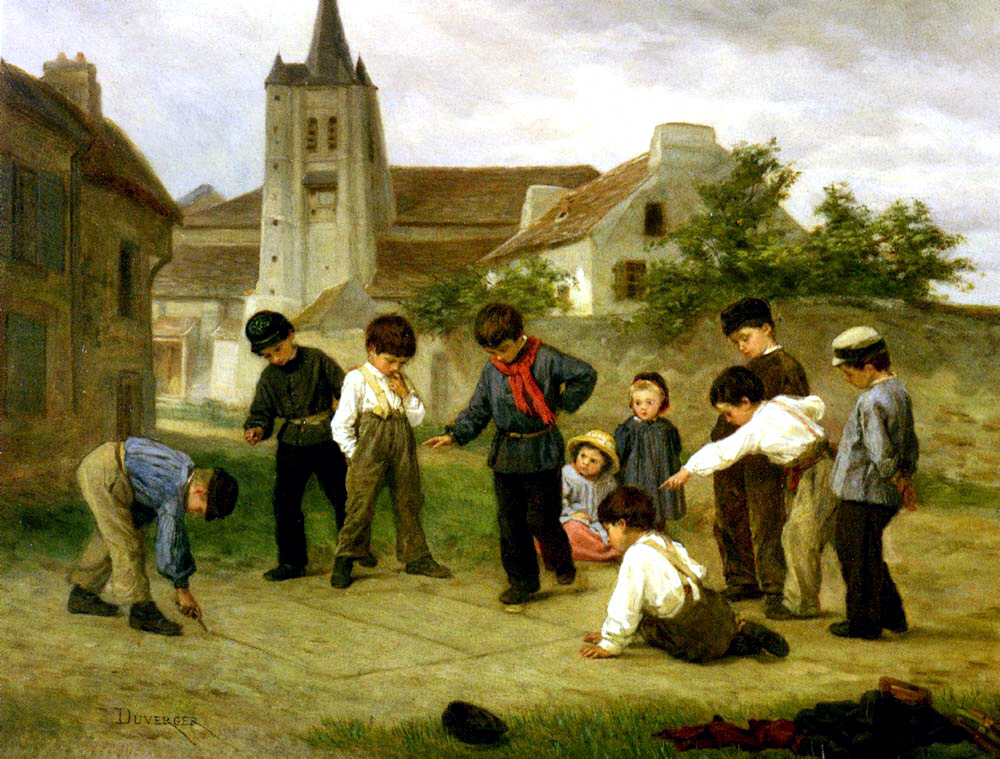
Hopscotch, by the French painter Théophile Emmanuel Duverger (1821-1898)

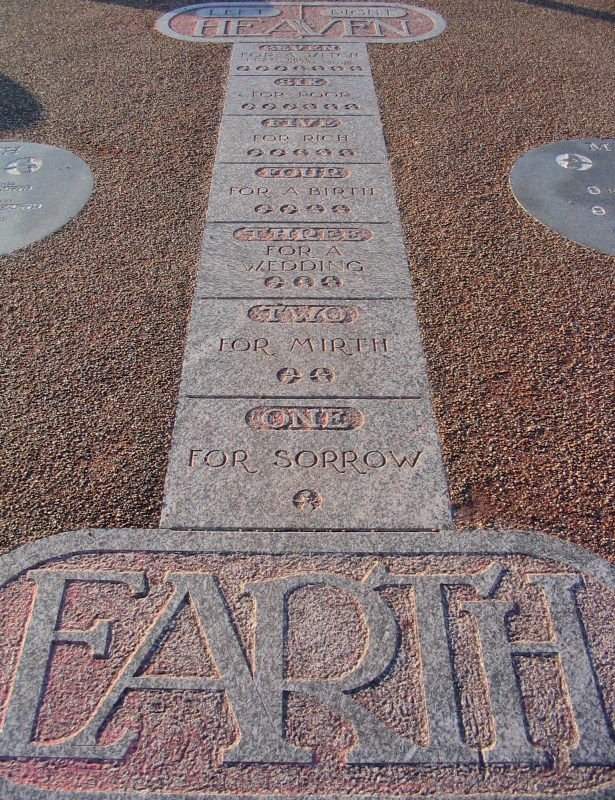
A hopscotch game with a traditional magpie rhyme in Morecambe, England

According to the German archeologist Ulrich Schädler, the origin of hopscotch is unknown, and there is no evidence that the game existed before the 16th century. B. B. Lal states (without evidence) that hopscotch was played c.1200 to 600–500 BCE during the Painted Grey ware era of India. Among the games prohibited by Buddha there is an entry that is reminiscent of hopscotch, but not specific enough to enable us to actually identify the game. Despite speculation that an ancient form of hopscotch was played by Roman children and soldiers, there is no evidence for this.

The first recorded references to the game in the English-speaking world date to the late seventeenth century, usually under the name "scotch-hop" or "scotch-hopper(s)". A manuscript Book of Games compiled between 1635 and 1672 by Francis Willughby refers to 'Scotch Hopper‥. They play with a piece of tile or a little flat piece of lead, upon a boarded floor, or any area divided into oblong figures like boards'. In Poor Robin's Almanack for 1677, the game is referred to as "Scotch-hoppers". The entry states, "The time when schoolboys should play at Scotch-hoppers." The 1707 edition of Poor Robin's Almanack includes the following phrase... "Lawyers and Physicians have little to do this month, so they may (if they will) play at Scotch-hoppers." In 1828, Webster's American Dictionary of the English Language also referred to the game as 'Scotch-hopper' ... 'a play in which boys hop over scotches and lines in the ground.'

=== Etymology ===
According to the Oxford English Dictionary, the etymology of hopscotch is a formation from the words "hop" and "scotch", the latter in the sense of "an incised line or scratch". The journal of the British Archaeological Association, volume 26 (dated March 9, 1870) states: "The sport of Hop-Scotch or Scotch-Hoppers is called in Yorkshire 'Hop-Score', and in Suffolk 'Scotch Hobbies or Hobby', from the boy who gets on the player's back whilst hopping or 'hicking', as it is there termed; and in Scotland it is known as 'Peevers, Peeverels, and Pabats'".

== Variations ==
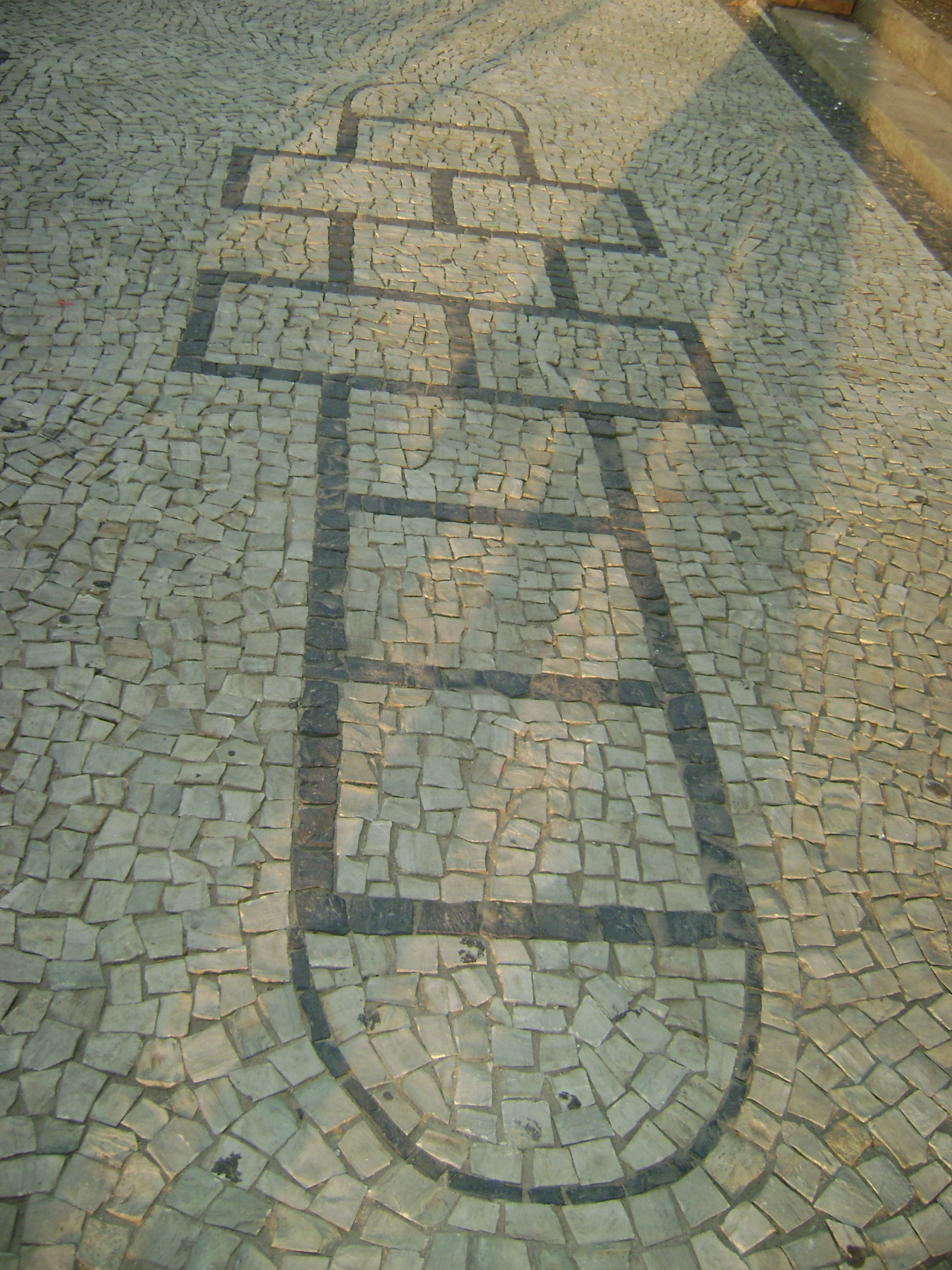
A variation in the entrance of CEFET-MG, Belo Horizonte, Brazil

There are many other forms of hopscotch played across the globe. In India it is called Stapu or Kit Kit in Hindi, Nondi/Paandi (Tamil), Thokkudu billa (Telugu) or Kith-Kith, Kunte Bille (Kannada). In Spain and some Latin American countries, it is called rayuela, although it may also be known as golosa or charranca. In France marelle is the name for the game.

In Turkey, it is Seksek (from sek, "to hop"). In Russian it is known as классики (klássiki, diminutive for the word meaning "classes"). In Bulgaria, the game is referred to as дама (dama) which means "lady".

In Poland, it appears in two forms: klasy ("classes") which has a rectangular shape and no marker (instead, players call out names of various items of a given class, e.g. colours or flowers, while jumping on successive fields); and pajac ("buffoon") which has a human shape and uses a thrown marker, e.g. a piece of glass or stone.

In Sweden the game is named hoppa hage (lit. "jumping pasture"), while in Norway it is called paradis, or Paradise. In Italy the game is known as campana (meaning "bell"), or mondo ("world"). In the Netherlands and Flanders, it is called Hinkelen ("skip"). In Bosnia, Croatia, and Serbia it is called školica, meaning "little school". In Malaysia, the most popular variant is called tengteng.

In Mexico, it is called bebeleche (mamaleche) meaning "drink milk" or avioncito meaning "little plane", after its shape. In Cuba and in Puerto Rico it is called "La Peregrina" (meaning "Pilgrim Girl") and the squares represent the 9 rings the pilgrim traveler has to pass in order to reach Heaven from Purgatory, according to Dante's Inferno.

In Romania the game is called șotron and is widely played by children all over the country. In Denmark it is called hinke. In Brazil it is called amarelinha, evolved from marelle, the French name for the game that became too closely associated with the radical amarelo (yellow) and its diminutive in -inho/a.

In Breton, the name is reg or delech. The Albanian variant is called rrasavi, which is composed of two words: rrasa ("the flat stone", an object used to play the game) and vi ("line", a reference to the lines that comprise the diagram of the course). In China, hopscotch is called tiao fangzi (跳房子, meaning "jumping the houses").

In the Philippines, the game is known as piko, a variation of hopscotch that features a territorial capture mechanic. It is played on a diagram of boxes, commonly shaped like a cross, a stylized human figure or a four-petal shaped zone called moons. Children take turns tossing a pamato (a flat marker, such as a stone or bottle cap) onto designated squares and hopping through the course on one foot. The goal is not only to complete the sequence without stepping on lines or losing balance, but also to claim territory. After a successful round, a player may capture a square, which then becomes off-limits to others. This rule adds a strategic dimension that increases the challenge as the game progresses. Across the country, the game is known by various regional names: kingking in the Ilocos Region, bikabix, kiki, or vicks-vicks in Cebu and other Visayan-speaking areas, buan-buan in parts of Mindanao and the Visayas, and saya-saya among Waray speakers, derived from the word saya meaning “skirt.”

In India, hopscotch is called "thikrya", because broken stones called thikrya are slid across the grid as players hop to each square. In South Korea, hopscotch is called sabangchigi (사방치기, meaning "Hitting the Four Cardinal Directions") and is widely played across the nation. In Ghana, hopscotch is called "tumatu" and is mostly played by children.

In Nepal, hopscotch is known locally as Dhyakki, which is also the name of the stone that is thrown across the grid of numbers. Another name for the game is Ek Khutte, which literally means "One Legged".

In Zimbabwe, the game is called pada and its mostly played by girls. In America the game is referred to as Hop Scotch and is played with a marker. It is found on elementary school playgrounds and is an activity most often played by girls.

=== Persian: Laylay (or Khane bazi) ===
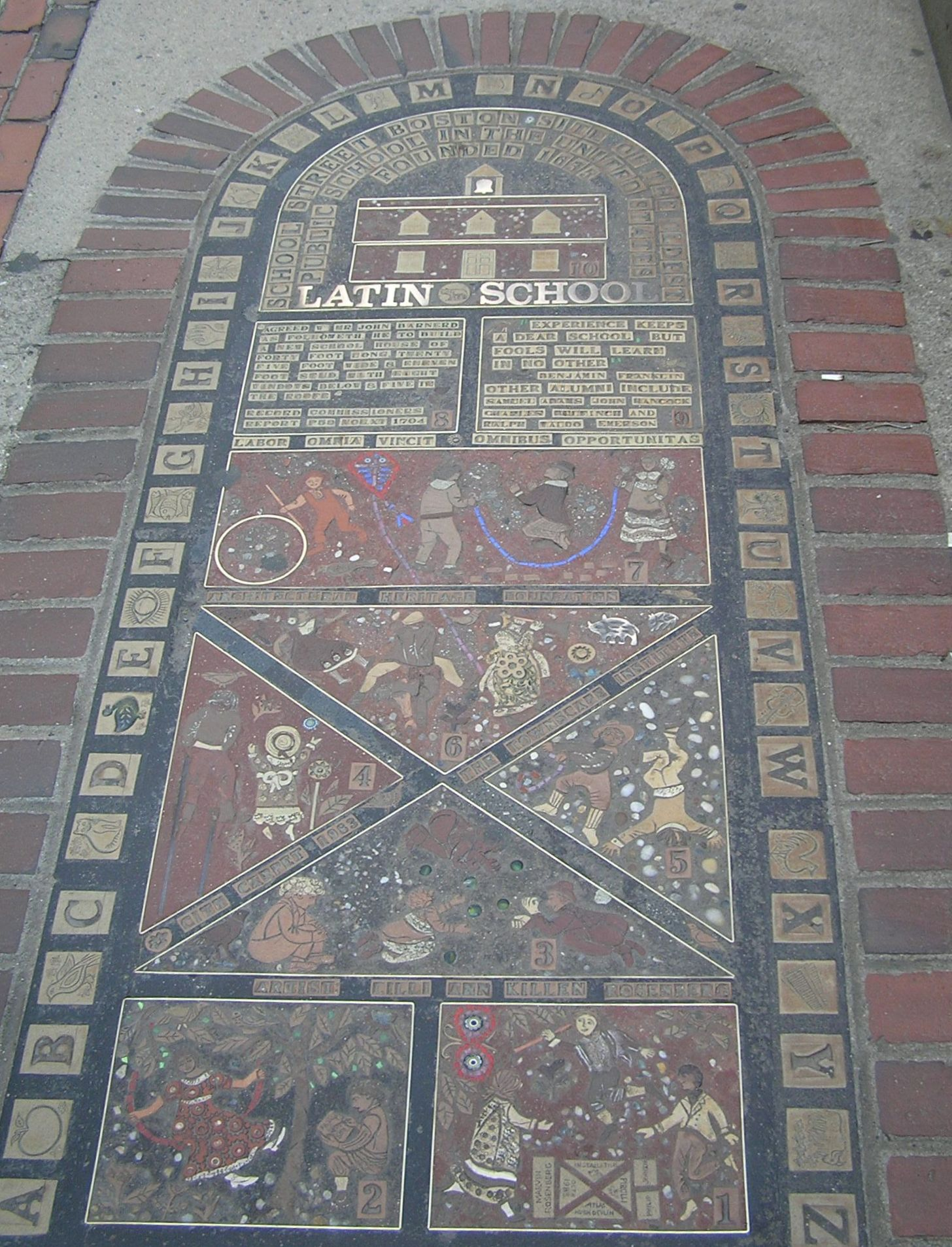
Street mosaic in the shape of hopscotch game in Boston, USA

The hopscotch game's generic name in Persian is Laylay. The most common form of Laylay in Iran resembles the older Western types and uses six or more (always an even number) side-by-side squares successively (vertically) numbered. The player uses a peg or a flat stone that the player must kick to the next square as the player is hopping. If either the stone or a player's foot lands on a line, the player forfeits the game (or loses a turn). Although somewhat less common, the contemporary Western type also is played.

=== Glasgow: Peevers or Peever ===
In the Glasgow area, the hopscotch game is called "beds" or "Peever(s)". "Peever" is also the name of the object which is slid across the grid to land in a square. In the 1950s and 1960s in Glasgow, it was common for the peever to be a shoe polish tin filled with stones or dirt and screwed shut.

Edinburgh children also call the game Peevers, played on a Peever bed with a chalked grid and a small flat tin - like a puck, where the chalk is stored during the game with the ballast.

=== French: Marelle, Escargot ===
"Marelle" is the name of the traditional hopscotch game in France, but a variant there is known as escargot (snail) or marelle ronde (round hopscotch). The variant is played on a spiral course. Players must hop on one foot to the center of the spiral and then reverse their path to back out again.

Players reaching the center without stepping on a line or losing balance mark one square with their initials, and from then on may place two feet in that square, while all other players must hop over it. The game ends when all squares are marked or no one can reach the center and the winner is the player who "owns" the most squares.

=== German: Himmel und Hölle ===
In Germany, Austria, and Switzerland the hopscotch game is called Himmel und Hölle (Heaven and Hell) although some other names are used, as well, depending on the region. The square below 1 or the 1 itself, is called Erde (Earth) while the second to last square is the Hölle (Hell) and the last one is Himmel (Heaven). The first player throws a small stone into the first square and then jumps to the square and must kick the stone to the next square and so on, however, neither the stone nor the player may stop in Hell so they try to skip that square.

=== India: Kith-Kith ===
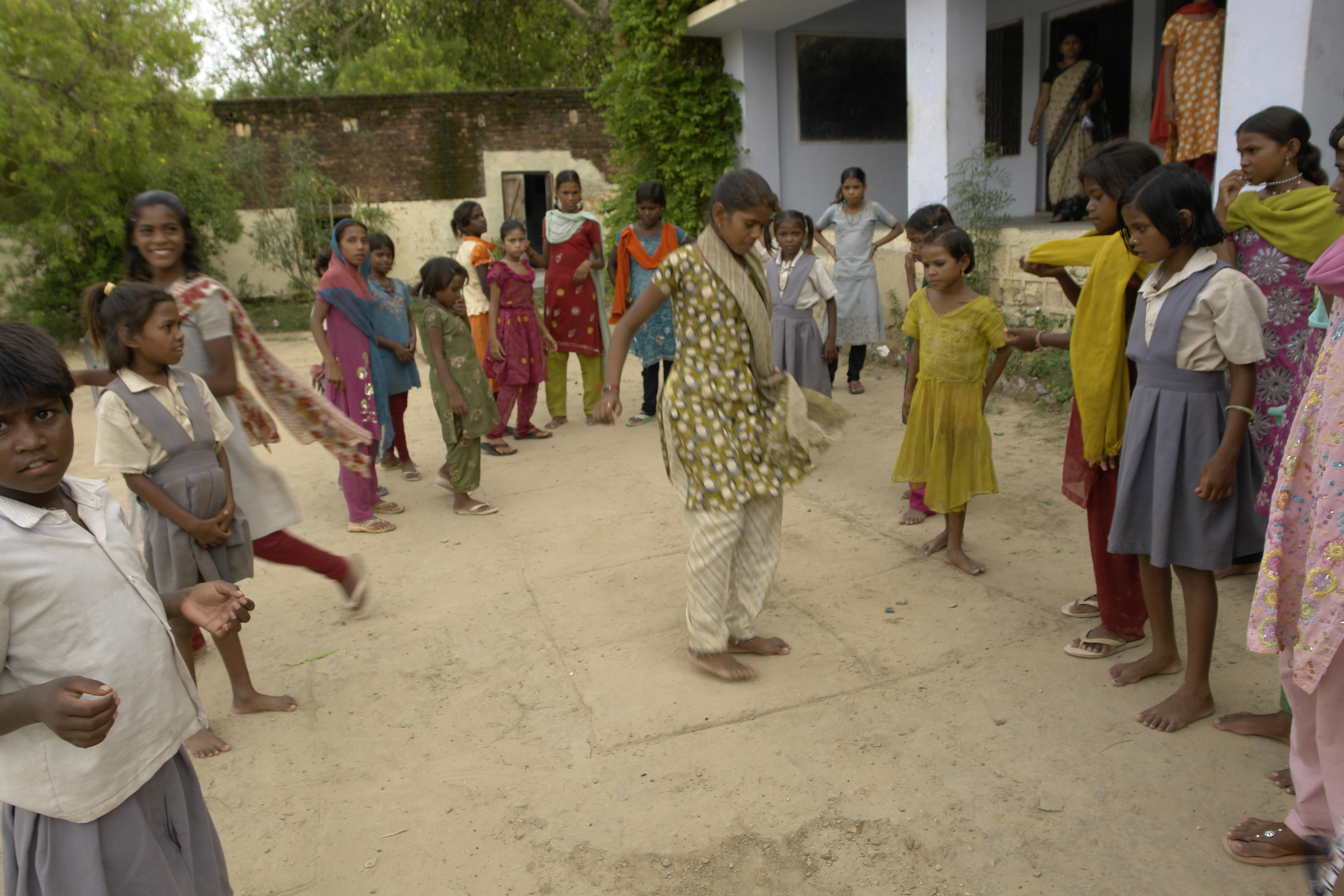
Girls playing hopscotch, Jaora, Madhya Pradesh, India

In India, hopscotch is also called Kith-Kith, Stapu, Langdi in the Hindi-speaking areas, or Ekhaat Duhaat or Ekka Dukka in Bengal, Tipri Pani in Maharashtra, Kunte bille in Karnataka, Paandi in Tamil Nadu, and Tokkudu Billa in Andhra Pradesh and Telangana. These games have similar principles in that players must hop on one foot and must throw the marker in the right square. The game is enjoyed by kids throughout the country.

=== New York City: Potsy ===
Potsy is the name of a hopscotch game that was played in New York City. The name probably refers to a "potsherd" that was used as a marker.

=== Brazil: Amarelinha ===
In Brazil, this game is called Amarelinha.

=== Spanish-speaking countries ===
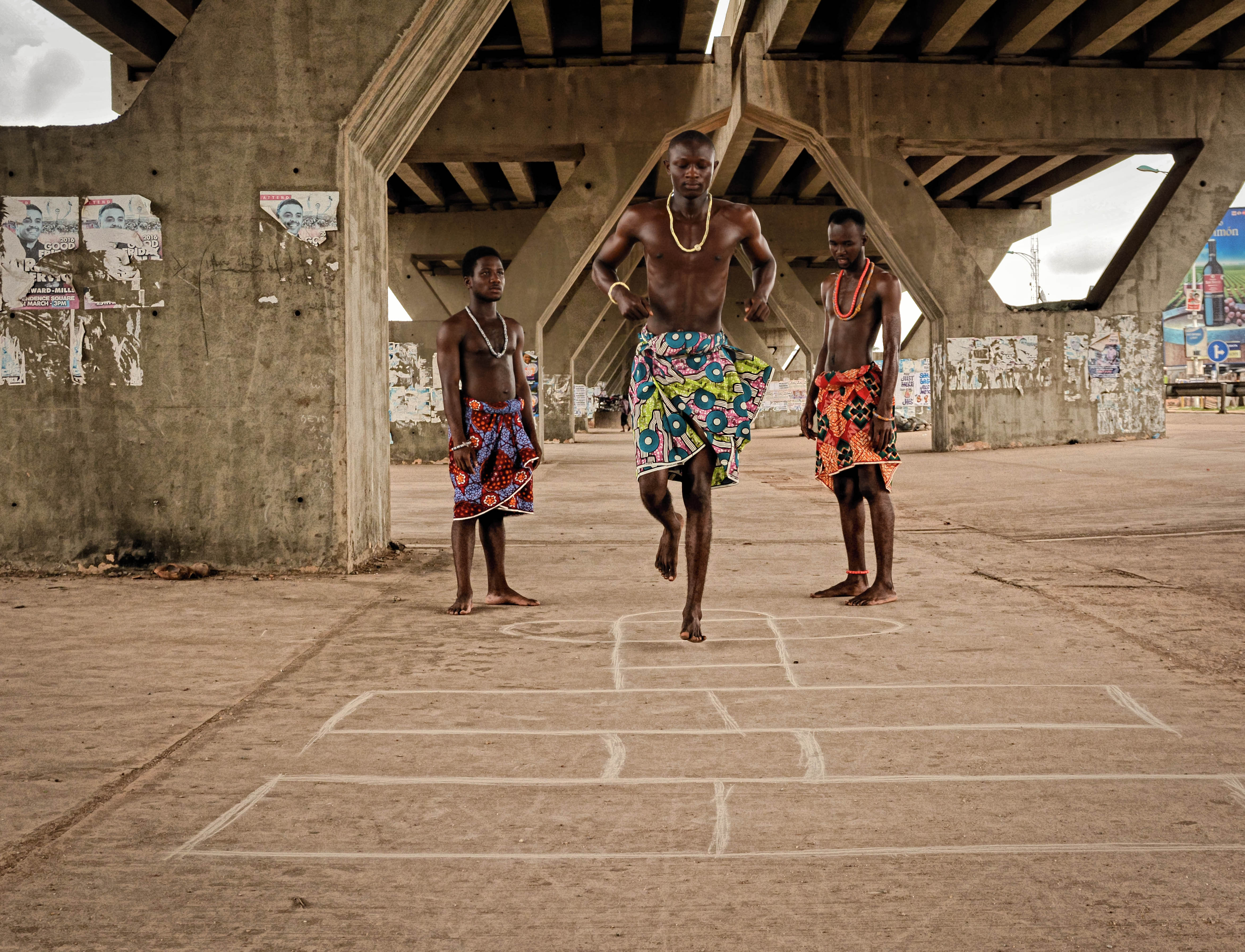
Boys playing tumatu in Ghana

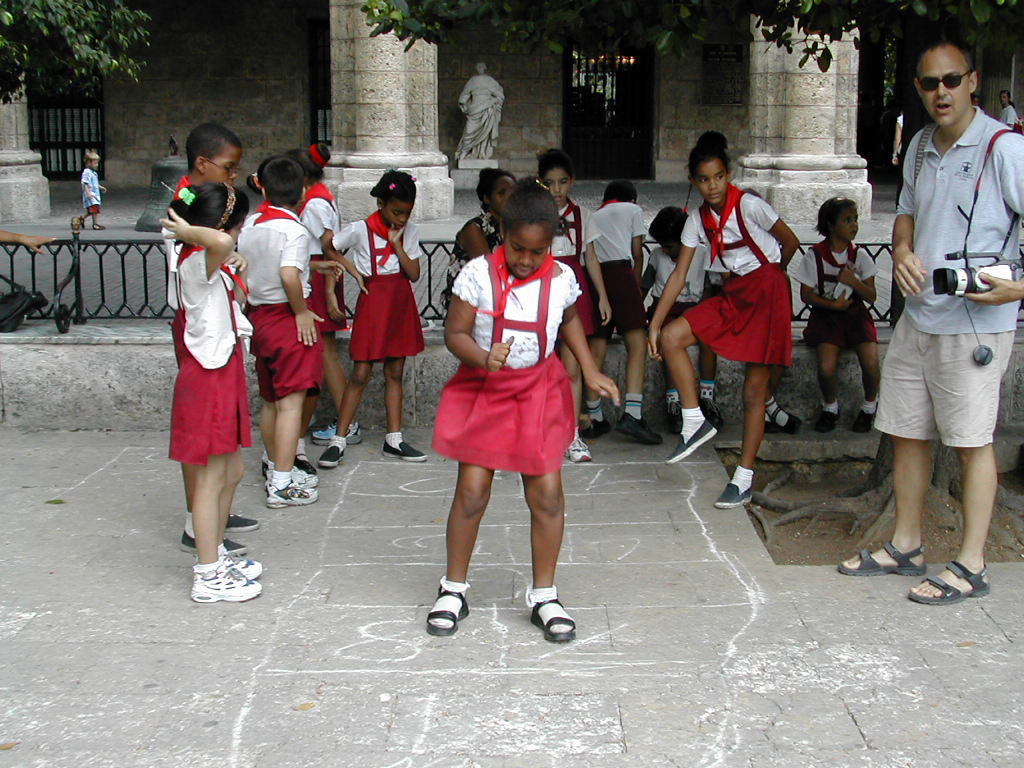
Primary schoolchildren playing hopscotch in Cuba, where the game is known as pon

In Spain, and several South American countries (Argentina, Bolivia, Costa Rica, Ecuador, Guatemala, Honduras, Nicaragua, Panama, Uruguay), the name of the hopscotch game is "Rayuela", However, it may also be known as golosa (as in Colombia) or charranca. In Chile, this game is called Luche. (Following some cultural evolution, "rayuela" is now applied to a throwing game in Chile.) In Mexico, the game is called bebeleche (mamaleche) meaning "drink milk" or avioncito meaning "little plane", after its shape. In Cuba and in Puerto Rico it is called "La Peregrina" In the Andean region of Bolivia, it is called "La Thunkuna".

=== South Asia: Chindro ===
Chindro is the South Asian version of hopscotch.

=== Catalonia: Xarranca ===
Xarranca is the Catalan version of hopscotch.

=== Ghana: Tumatu ===
In Ghana, the name of the hopscotch game is tumatu.

=== Portugal: Jogo da Macaca ===
In Portugal, this game is called Jogo da Macaca.

=== Russia: Klassiki or Klassy ===
In Russian, the game is called klassiki (классики) or klassy (классы).

=== Indonesia: Engklek ===
Indonesia has many variants of this game. The name "Engklek" is the Javanese variant. Other variants are Ponci (West Sumatera), Sekebat (Aceh), Pecut Kelapa (Bangka Belitung), Kecek (Bali), and Setatak (Riau).

== Longest design ==
During the COVID-19 pandemic, in April 2020 a giant hopscotch game with nearly 1,000 squares was created in Edinburgh, to be used while following social distancing rules.

== World record ==
The current Guinness Book of World Records holder for the fastest hopscotch game is Ashrita Furman, at 1 minute and 2 seconds.

== In popular culture ==
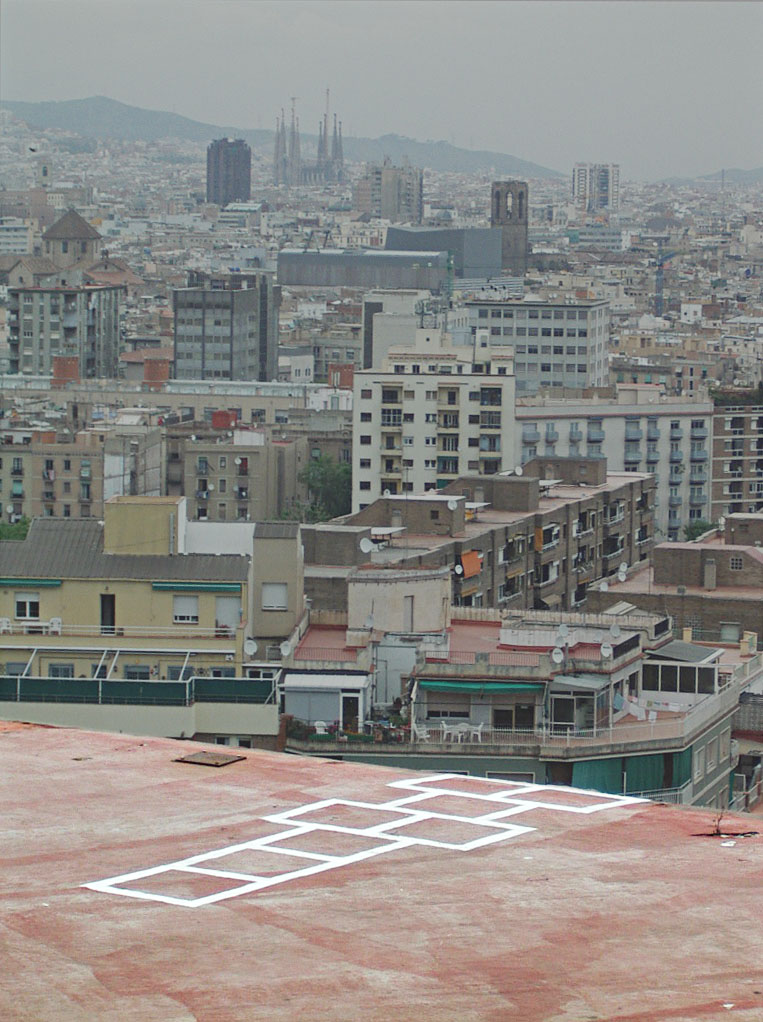
"Hopscotch to oblivion", Barcelona, Spain; an example of dark humor

- A hopscotch court drawn such that the area where the final step would be is instead a sheer drop such as a building or cliff, such that any participant would fall to their death upon completion, is a motif occasionally seen in fiction, sometimes as a device for black comedy.
  - A notable example is featured on the cover of the Korn album Follow the Leader, which focuses on a young girl participating in the game at a cliff. The concept was described by Jonathan Davis as representing a loss of innocence.
- A 2010 PBS documentary, New York Street Games, includes "potsy", described as a "girl's game" in the film.
- Argentine writer Julio Cortázar's 1963 novel Hopscotch (Spanish: Rayuela) takes its title and non-linear structure from the game. The novel includes a "Table of Instructions" inviting the reader to "hopscotch" through its 155 chapters in any order rather than reading sequentially, and is widely regarded as one of the most important works of Latin American literature.
