= Traditional games of Andhra Pradesh =

Traditional Indian games

Traditional games of Andhra Pradesh, like many other traditional games played in India, involve games which are played mostly by children. These games may also be enjoyed by other people of any age, as it reminds them of their childhood. Despite the advent of computers and technology, with children preferring to spend their times indoors, these games are still very popular in the Andhra Pradesh. They are also played in great and small towns all over India and Pakistan, especially in Andhra Pradesh, Tamil Nadu, Punjab, as well as Cambodia and Italy..

== Traditional childhood games ==
Hide and Seek (Deef)

Hide and seek is commonly played. In this game a player starts by closing his or her eyes and counts up to 50 or 100 whilst facing towards a wall, tree, or pillar. The other players, who usually number about 5 to 10, hide. The first player should find all the hidden players who would hide somewhere near. If any of the other players hit the first player on his or her back by saying "deef" with palm of a hand without being spotted then the first player should restart the game. If the first player spots any other player without the other playing saying deef as above, then the other player is out. The objective of the game is for the first player to find all hidden players without him/her restarting the game. The game is repeated with every player playing as the first player.

Kancha (Goti)

Once famous as a Gully sport, Kancha was a favorite of many young boys in nearby town and villages of Andhra Pradesh. It has its own modus operandi; it is played using marbles called a "kancha". The players are to hit the selected target "kancha" using their own marble ball. The winner takes all of the "kanchas" from rest of the players.

Goleelu (Marbles)

There are several games using Goleelu (marbles). These games are usually played by young boys. Each player is expected to own a few marbles in order to participate. The player would gain or lose marbles while playing these games or these games can be played in a friendly no loss of marbles way. Some games are moodu kanchalu (three kancha), oka kancha (one kancha), Cara.

Seven Stones (Satoliya, Pithoo Phod)

This game is enjoyed by a number boys and girls; it is an entertaining, simple and inexpensive game. It needs seven small flat stones; every stone size should be less than the other stone. Players put these stones over another in decreasing order until it looks like a small tower. It is then hit it by a handball covered in cloth from a fixed distance. Any number of people can play this game. This game is also known as "Pithoo" in some regions of India.

Posham Posh

Posham Pa is an outdoor game played with 3 or more players. This game is more commonly played in rural India by 4 -8 year olds.Two players make a gate like structure by joining their hands and holding it high up together. These players sing the song while other pass through the gate by running around the players in a line. Once the song finishes the players close the gate and one of the player is caught inside the gate. The game ends when all the children have been caught in the gate.

Lattu

"Spinning top" or "Lattu" was once the most popular street game of India. It is still played in some of the inner colonies of the old city area of Udaipur. Lattu is a part of life for children in Indian villages. The game involves spinning a "lattu" (top)—a solid turnip-shaped wooden toy with a grooved lower half with two nails dug at the top and the bottom. A cotton string is wrapped around the lower half of the "lattu" to make it spin.

Aankh Micholi

Eyes of one of the players are closed with a handkerchief and they have to find the other players in the defined area. The eyes are closed by the handkerchief and then they with many people around, they have to determine where their partners are. Sometimes this game is also played among the couples by their bumps. It is not an easy game, so before starting the game, players take a long deep breath and smell the fragrance of their spouses, where it is believed that the senses will save their day.

Karra billa

is played with a player hitting a thick and round smaller stick (billa) of about 10cm with a thick and round larger stick (karra) of about 1.5 feet long. These sticks are usually made of wood with the billa being slightly convex towards its edges.

Bechhu aata

is played by girls with a player drawing a large rectangle of about 4 meters in length and 3 meters in breadth with chalk. Then, about 5 rows are drawn with rows parallel to the shortest side. Each of the divided space is about 50cm in width. This game involves hopping in each divided space with a single leg.

Veeri Veeri Gummadi Pandu

is played by a group of children, with all but two being the hiders. One person (usually an adult) and one person (usually a child) both sit on the floor. The adult, will grab hold of the child's hand, and the other will cover the child's eyes. They will say “Veeri Veeri Gummadi pandu, veeri peru emiti?”. While this is happening, the other children will switch spots. The adult will point the child's hand and the child will guess who it is. If they guess correctly, somebody who is not the person they guessed will hide somewhere. If they guess incorrectly, the person who their hand is pointed at will hide. In both ways, the adult will say “ [Childs Name] paroopo!” After all the children have hidden, the game is played as hide and seek.

== Variations of tag ==
Chain

This is a variant of Tag in which each person to be caught joins hands with "it", and the chain is formed by chasing the others as a pair. As more people are caught they too join hands with the "it" players, forming a lengthening chain. The person who is last and still not in the chain is the winner. This variation is also called "Blob". Only those at the ends of the chain are able to catch someone, as they are the only ones with a free hand. A variant has chains of four splitting in two.

Donga police

Players are divided into teams Donga and Police. Police seeks the donga team and brings it to one place and then the teams are exchanged. Donga means thief.

Langdi Tang

In a defined area one person hops on one leg and tries to catch all the other players.

Kabaddi

Kabaddi (sometimes transliterated Kabbadi or Kabadi; (Telugu: కబడ్దీ) is a South Asian team sport. The name is derived from the Tamil word (கை-பிடி, kai-piṭi, hand-catch), which is equivalent to saying "holding hands". Two teams occupy opposite halves of a small field and take turns sending a "raider" into the other half, in order to win points by tackling members of the opposing team; then the raider tries to return to their own half, holding their breath and chanting the word "Kabaddi" during the whole raid. The raider must not cross the lobby unless he touches any of their opponents. If he does so then he will be declared as "out". There is also a bonus line which ensures extra points for the raider if he manages to touch the lobby and return to their side of the field successfully.

Kho Kho

Kho kho is played with two 12-player teams; one team (9 players) sits on ground between two poles and the other team sends three team members. The sitting team has to catch these players before time runs out.

== Traditional children games ==
Traditional children games of Andhra Pradesh include Gujjana Goollu, Toy Wedding, Ramudu Sita, Kothi Kommachi, Achenagandlu, Chendata, Chuk Chuk Pulla, Dagudu Mootalu, Gudu Gudu Gunjam, Daadi, Kappa Gantulu, Bomma Borusa, Bachaala Aata, Kiriki, London Aata, Tokkudu Billa, Yedu penkulata (Lagori), Vamanaguntalu (Pallanguzhi), Chadarangam (Chess), Naela Banda/Nela Banda (Oonch Neech), Puli Joodam, Ashta Chamma, Vaikuntapali (Snakes and ladders), Nalugu Stambalata, Nalugu Rallu Aata – Game of 4 stones.

Some more games include Galli Cricket, Dili dhandu, Dagudumuthallu, kanlaki ganthallu, thokudu billa, raja rani, Spinning top (Bongaram), viri viri gumadipandu, kappa gantulu, bomma pellilu, amma nana atta, lingosha (Chendatta), gudu gudu gunjam, yedu penkallu (Lagori), pulli cut, Vaikuntapali (Snakes and Ladders), Bandana Bhomma, cycle tyre racing, carrom, chess, and shuttlecock.

Some of the above have become obsolete.

== See also ==
- Traditional games of India
- Sports in Andhra Pradesh
