= Nalugu Stambhalata =

Nalugu Stambhalata or Nalugu Sthambhalata may refer to:

- Nalugu Stambhalata (film), a 1982 Telugu film
- Nalugu Stambhalata (game), a children's game popular in Andhra Pradesh, India
