= Darebase =

Tag game

- Players: 10+ to 100+
- Setup time: 3 minutes
- Playing time: variable
- Chance: None
- Age range: 7 and up
- Skills: Running, Observation

Darebase or dare base, also known as prisoners' base, Chevy Chace, or Release the Prisoner and originally as bars, base or prisoners' bars, is a tag game between two or more teams on an open field that places a premium on speed and agility. Darebase holds some similarity to capture the flag in its basic premise of chase, capture, and conquer. It differs in that the game field consists of a large no-man's land with team bases occupying two opposite ends of the field and in the methods of achieving victory. A variation called stealbase uses an object that may be either touched or stolen (as in capture the flag) to achieve victory.

The size of the game field typically ranges from between that of a basketball court and about half the size of a football or soccer field. Each base belongs to the team that starts on that side and if the distance between the bases is longer than the average player is able to sprint, game play will begin to suffer. Effective game play can be achieved with as few as ten players and up to a hundred or more just as long as the game field and base lines are large enough to accommodate them.

Darebase is popular in many areas of the United States as a recess game and at summer camps in part because of its simplicity, flexibility, and capacity to accommodate players of varying age and ability, as well as its potential for rapid and dynamic play even when teams are evenly matched.

== History ==
The game appears to have been known originally as "bars", "base" or "prisoners' bars". One of the earliest known references dates from the early 14th century, when King Edward III of England issued an order prohibiting "barres" from being played in the avenues of the Palace of Westminster.

An early description of Prisoner's Base, entitled De Ludo Gjitûcum Chudûni, was written by Thomas Hyde who described it as a game from Mesopotamia. It was published in 1767 under the name Prison-Base and Prisoners Base in Gregory Sharpe's book Syntagma dissertationum quas olim Thomas Hyde S.T.P. separatim edidit. In 1796, Hyde's playing rules have been extensively translated into German and published in Germany under the name Das Foppen und Fangen. Prisonners-Base in the game book Spiele zur Übung und Erholung des Körpers und Geistes by Johann Christoph Friedrich GutsMuths.

John Byng, in a diary entry for 12 May 1794, refers to members of the Cheshire militia playing "their county game of prisoners bars which is a sport of mere agility, and speed and seemingly productive of quarrels: In my opinion it is far inferior to cricket, cudgel-playing and many other provincial sports.... For lightness and to prevent being touch'd by an adversary – they strip themselves almost naked."

Joseph Strutt, writing in 1801, makes clear that there were variant local versions:

About 1770, I saw a grand match at base played in the fields behind Montague House, now the British Museum, by twelve gentlemen of Cheshire against twelve of Derbyshire, for a considerable sum of money, which afforded much entertainment to the spectators. In Essex they play this game with the addition of two prisons, which are stakes driven into the ground, parallel with the home boundaries, and about thirty yards from them; and every person who is touched on either side in the chase, is sent to one or other of these prisons, where he must remain till the conclusion of the game, if not delivered previously by one of his associates, and this can only be accomplished by touching him, which is a difficult task, requiring the performance of the most skilful players, because the prison belonging to either party is always much nearer to the base of their opponents than to their own; and if the person sent to relieve his confederate be touched by an antagonist before he reaches him, he also becomes a prisoner, and stands in equal need of deliverance. The addition of the prisons occasions a considerable degree of variety in the pastime, and is frequently productive of much pleasantry.

A correspondent writing to The Times in 1830 commented: "Until about 20 or 30 years ago, the fields around London, Marylebone-fields, the Long-fields, Spa-fields, &c., were alive with players at cricket, trap-ball, foot-ball, prisoners' base, and other healthful and inspiriting amusements."

The alternative name "Chevy Chace" is derived from the traditional "Ballad of Chevy Chase", and the semi-legendary battle on the Anglo-Scottish border that it supposedly commemorates. G. R. Sims in 1906 described Chevy Chace as "a form of prisoners' base in which one unit of a 'side' is captured and held to ransom until a comrade rescues him".

A street scene photographed in Blue Eye, Missouri in c.1916 was allegedly taken during a local game of darebase.

=== Outside of the West ===
In India, a similar game is known as Gella-Chutt (transl. "the king escaped") or Sita Udhar ("Sita is over there"), in which the game represents the struggle of a king's guards to rescue him, or represents the scene from the Ramayana in which Sita is saved from the demons of Lanka.

== Rules and tactics ==
=== Achieving victory ===
Darebase can be won in four different ways. First, by capturing all of the opposing team's players. Second, by occupying the opposing team's base when the opposing team is absent from their base. Third, by having captured more of the opposing team's players when time has run out, though the game does not require a time limit in order to be played. One variation of darebase, in which bases represent islands in the no-man's, allow victory to be achieved when one player makes the ultimate dare by running all the way around the opposing team's base and back into their own without being tagged by the other team.

=== Being fresher ===
For a player to be captured they must be tagged by an opposing team's player that has entered no-man's land after that player, a condition commonly referred to as being "fresher." Players can return to their base line at any time to become fresher. If they are able, they may also use the opposing team's base line to become "fresher" and to become safe from capture.

In Hawaii, the concept of "fresher" is referred to as "mana" or power. One's mana decreases over time and can be recharged by returning to one's base. In another variation, a team member may transfer mana to another player, though this may lead to confusion in games with large numbers of players.

=== Dares and waves ===
Game play typically starts with players engaging in a series of feints, or dares. Dares take the form of a player approaching the opposite base and baiting opposing players into giving chase. The pursuer is then drawn towards the enemy line. The pursued must assess where their personal point-of-no-return lies based on a combination of factors: their own speed and agility, the speed of their pursuer, and the speed of anyone backing them up. Being able to get as close as possible to this point without crossing it affords the greatest tactical advantage and results in the most dynamic play. If players on both teams cautiously avoid the point-of-no-return and thus do not invite pursuit, a condition of stalemate may result.

If a player's dare is accepted, the pursuer will often cross their own point-of-no-return in an attempt to capture their quarry. This usually results in one or more players from the team of the pursued crossing their lines to intercept the pursuer. Any time members of one team cross their own line, the opposing team tends to respond with fresher players. This causes waves of alternating advantage to converge in the center of the field. When a pursuer is faced with a fresher opponent, he or she may choose to retreat either to their own line or to the position of a fresher teammate, attempt to complete the capture, or attempt to cross the opposing team's base line at an undefended point.

=== Becoming a spy ===
Being able to cross the opposing team's base line affords a strong tactical advantage analogous to a flanking maneuver. A player who has achieved this position is sometimes referred to as a spy. A spy is able to chase opposing players from behind and must be guarded closely, effectively neutralizing one or more players in the process. A spy may choose to remain in place as a continuous threat. However, it is rare for such a player to remain in place for very long after they have rested. A player capable of crossing the opponent's line, especially early in the game, will almost always use their advantage to attempt to capture one of the opposing team's fastest players. This fact only serves to enhance the degree to which spies are treated with caution.

=== Jail and variations ===
When one player captures another player, both players become immediately inactive or neutral until the captor finishes escorting the captured player to jail. Each team's jail is located in a corner of the field and is represented by a specific marked point on the base line such as a field cone or an article of clothing. The jailed player must be in physical contact with the jail point to be eligible for rescue. They may stretch out or lay down to increase their cross section. If an additional player is captured and brought to jail, that player must be in physical contact with the first player and may also stretch out. As this chain of jailed players gets longer its end gets closer to its players base line. This makes it easier for would-be rescuers to reach the line without being caught themselves.

To free players from jail, a rescuer must tag the jailed player. There are several variations of darebase that hinge on different rules for freeing captured players from jail. In one variation, only one person can be freed at a time: whichever player has been in jail the longest. In this variation, the most recently captured player joins the line at the point of the jail while the players that have been in jail the longer move towards the other end of the line. The most senior prisoner must be tagged in order to be freed.

Another variation allows all players to be freed if any of the jailed players are tagged.

Yet another variation is actually a hybrid of the two above. To free all players, the rescuer must tag the point of the jail. Alternately, a rescuer is able to free just the most senior prisoner who is at the end of the line by tagging them directly.

Once a rescuer has freed one or more prisoners they and those who are freed are immune to capture until they return to their team's base. This is often referred to as a "free walk."

=== Natural emergence of tactics ===
Darebase provides several key roles that players typically occupy with very little discussion or leadership. Some players choose to place themselves out front, attempting to draw chase from the opposing team's fastest players. This dueling eventually results in one team's fastest player(s) being captured, or in gaining the advantage of crossing the other team's base line. Other players, whose personal point-of-no-return is closer to their home base, naturally employ more defensive tactics such as guarding the line, the jail, or shadowing spies.

== Cultural references ==
References to the game are found in a range of early modern English literary works, including those of Christopher Marlowe, Edmund Spenser, Richard Brome, and Michael Drayton.

As "base", it receives a passing mention in Shakespeare's Cymbeline (set in Ancient Britain, but first performed in 1611):

He, with two striplings, lads more like to run
The country base than to commit such slaughter ...
Made good the passage...

— Cymbeline, Act 5, scene 3

In F. Anstey's comic novel Vice Versa (1882), the boys at Dr Grimstone's boarding school are required to play a game called "chevy" – "so called from the engagement famed in ballad and history", and said to be "commonly known as 'prisoners' base'".

Marcel Proust refers to playing it on the Champs Elysées in Swann's Way, the first volume of In Search of Lost Time.

Dare-Base was the original title of the 1952 Nero Wolfe mystery novel, Prisoner's Base, by Rex Stout (1886–1975). The plot clearly references the game. "The title on my manuscript was Dare-Base, from a game we played in Kansas when I was a boy," Stout told biographer John McAleer. "My publisher, Harold Guinzburg, said it was better known as prisoner's base."
