= Gella-Chutt =

Gella-Chutt (transl. "the king ran away") is a traditional Indian game from Tripura. In the game, one team has a king stationed in a "prison", which is at a distance from the "home" area. The goal of the king is to reach home with the help of his teammates ("guards") without being tagged by the opponents.

== Variants ==
A similar Bengali game exists known as "Bouchi", in which the king and guards are instead referred to as the "bride" and "bride-snatchers". The bride-snatchers are allowed to tag and eliminate the opponents before the bride starts running towards the home, provided that they hold their breaths once they leave the home; a bride-snatcher who fails to hold their breath can themselves be tagged out by an opponent.

In Hindi, a similar game is known as budhiya kabaddi, with the king considered to be an old lady. Another name for the game is Sita Udhar, which references the scene from the Ramayana where Sita is saved from the demons of Lanka.

The Western equivalent to Gella-Chutt is prisoner's base.
