= Dhopkhel =

Traditional Indian ball game

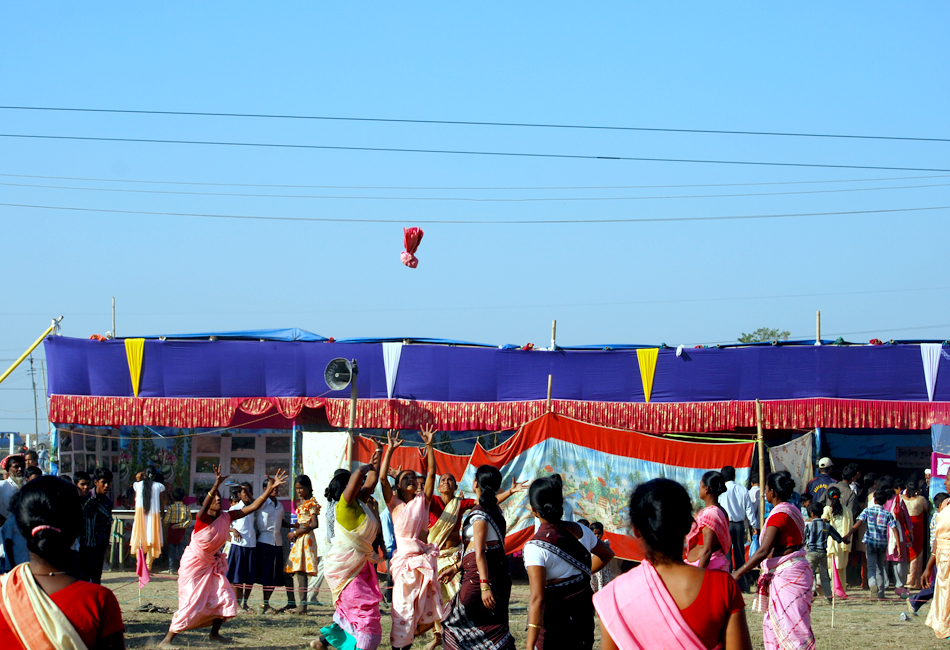
Dhopkhel is played by both indigenous Assamese men and women

Dhopkhel, also transliterated dhop khel and dhoop khel (Assamese: ঢোপখেল), is a traditional ball game played in the Indian state of Assam. The game is played between two teams of 11 on a 125 m × 80 m field bounded by four flags. The players take turns throwing the ball at the opponent to knock them out of the game, while seeking to catch the ball and avoid being tagged by other players. It is a test of speed, stamina, and acrobatic skills.

Matches of the game were traditionally made to observe the spring and New Year festival of Bihu. The game was once played to amuse Ahom royalty as a spectator sport. It is no longer widely played in Assam, though efforts are being made to revive it.

== Rules ==
The field is divided into two halves, with a player of one team trying to throw the ball so that it hits a designated opponent below the waist. If the hit is successful, the designated opponent must try to catch the ball after it rebounds off of them (making sure none of the opponents catch the ball), and then run back to their own team's half of the field without being touched by any of the players on the first team, in order to be successful. At the end of the game, the team with the greater number of successful players wins.
