= Traditional games of India =

Pre-colonial sports heritage of India

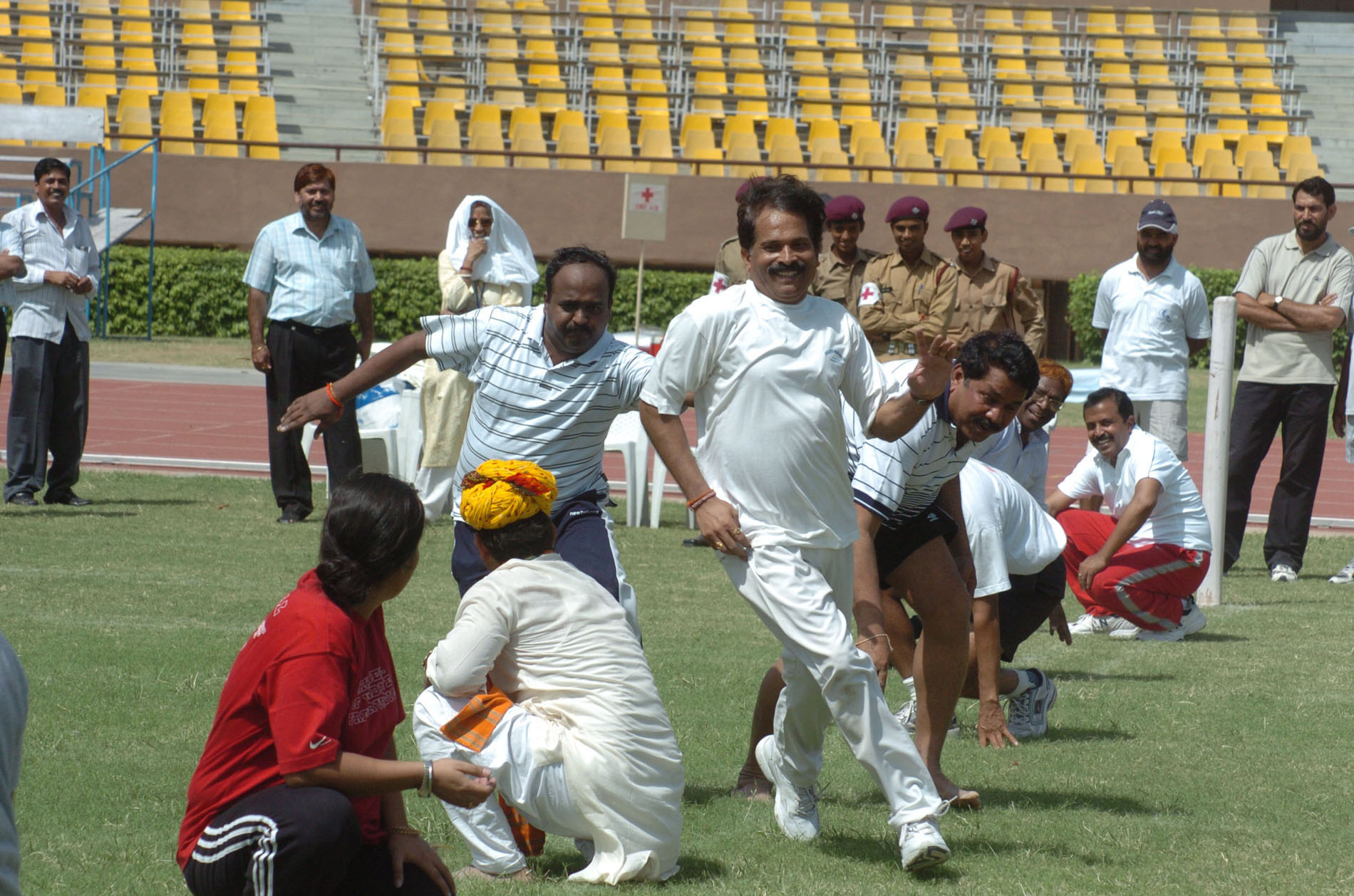
A kho-kho defensive player (centre) runs from one half of the court to the other to avoid being touched by an opponent.

India has several traditional games and sports, some of which have been played for thousands of years. Their popularity has greatly declined in the modern era, with Western sports having overtaken them during the British Raj, and the Indian government now making some efforts to revive them. Many of these games do not require much equipment or playing space. Some of them are only played in certain regions of India, or may be known by different names and played under different rules and regulations in different regions of the country.

== History ==
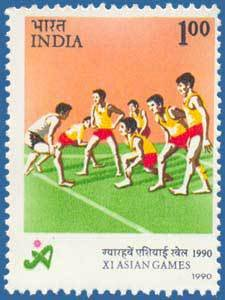
An Indian stamp from 1990 commemorating the introduction of kabaddi, India's most popular traditional sport, into the Asian Games.

=== Ancient era ===
Kho-kho has been played since at least the fourth century BC. Kabaddi and kho-kho may have had certain aspects of their gameplay mentioned in the Mahabharata, which was written before 300 AD. Atya-patya is mentioned in the Naṟṟiṇai, written in 300 AD or before. Chaturanga is an ancient board game which experienced various modifications as it was transmitted from India toward Europe and became the modern game of chess. Some of these games were used for military training purposes; constant warfare between Indians/against invaders forced an emphasis on physical activities related to fighting. One example of this connection between sports and war was Abhimanyu's piercing of the Chakravyuha as depicted in the Mahabharata, which may have had a connection to the skills used in kabaddi and kho-kho.

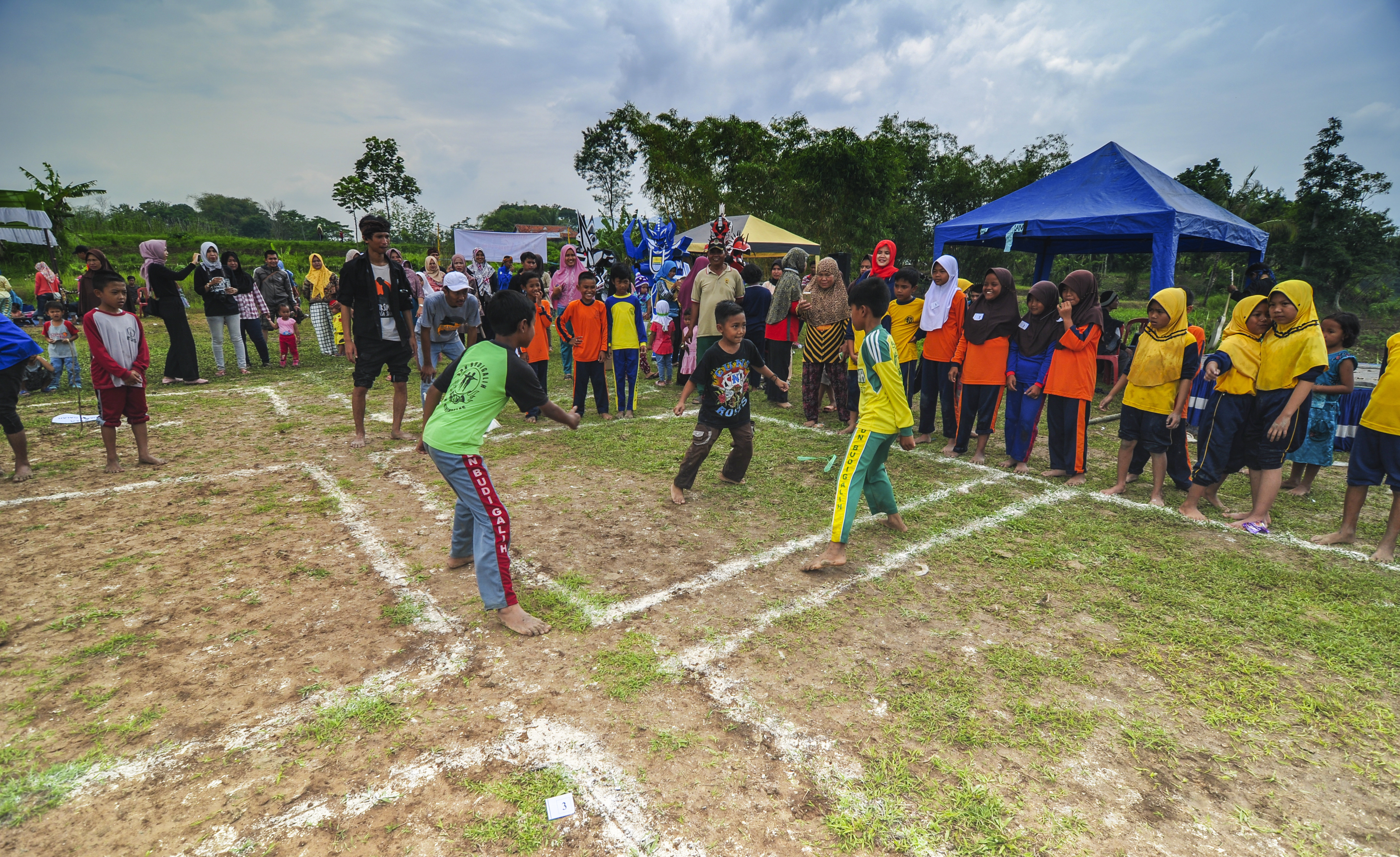
A few traditional Indian games have been noted for being similar to games in Southeast Asia, such as atya-patya, whose Indonesian variant gobak sodor is pictured here.

Traditional Indian games served various purposes throughout and had various connections to Indian history; for example, certain aspects of the Bengali hopscotch game of ekka-dokka may have represented concepts of social division of property, kabaddi may have been used as a preparation for hunting, and the Bengali tag game of gollachut may have represented escape attempts by agricultural slaves during the Indus Valley Civilization. Hindu teachings placed emphasis on being physically fit, with the Kshatriya warrior caste in particular having to practice martial activities such as archery, while Buddhist teachings were more mixed; Buddha prohibited some traditional games which were considered to be causing negligence amongst people, though he himself played certain other games, such as archery and kabaddi. Buddhist monks, who generally shunned violence, adopted the use of Indian martial arts to protect themselves. Different activities were interrelated; the breathing aspects of kabaddi had connections with the pranayama breath-control techniques from yoga and the martial art of kalaripayattu was practiced in tandem with atya-patya by soldiers in Kerala.

=== Indo-Muslim era ===
During Mughal rule, some of the traditional games were greatly patronised and played in modified ways; for example, Akbar invented a version of polo which could be played at night by setting the ball on fire, and played a magnified version of pachisi with courtesans acting as the pieces on the board. However, Hindu subjects were discouraged from drinking and playing polo, which were apt to make them unruly and rebellious. Wrestling was popular at the time as well, with Persian and Indian forms of wrestling merging to form pehlwani.

=== Colonial era ===
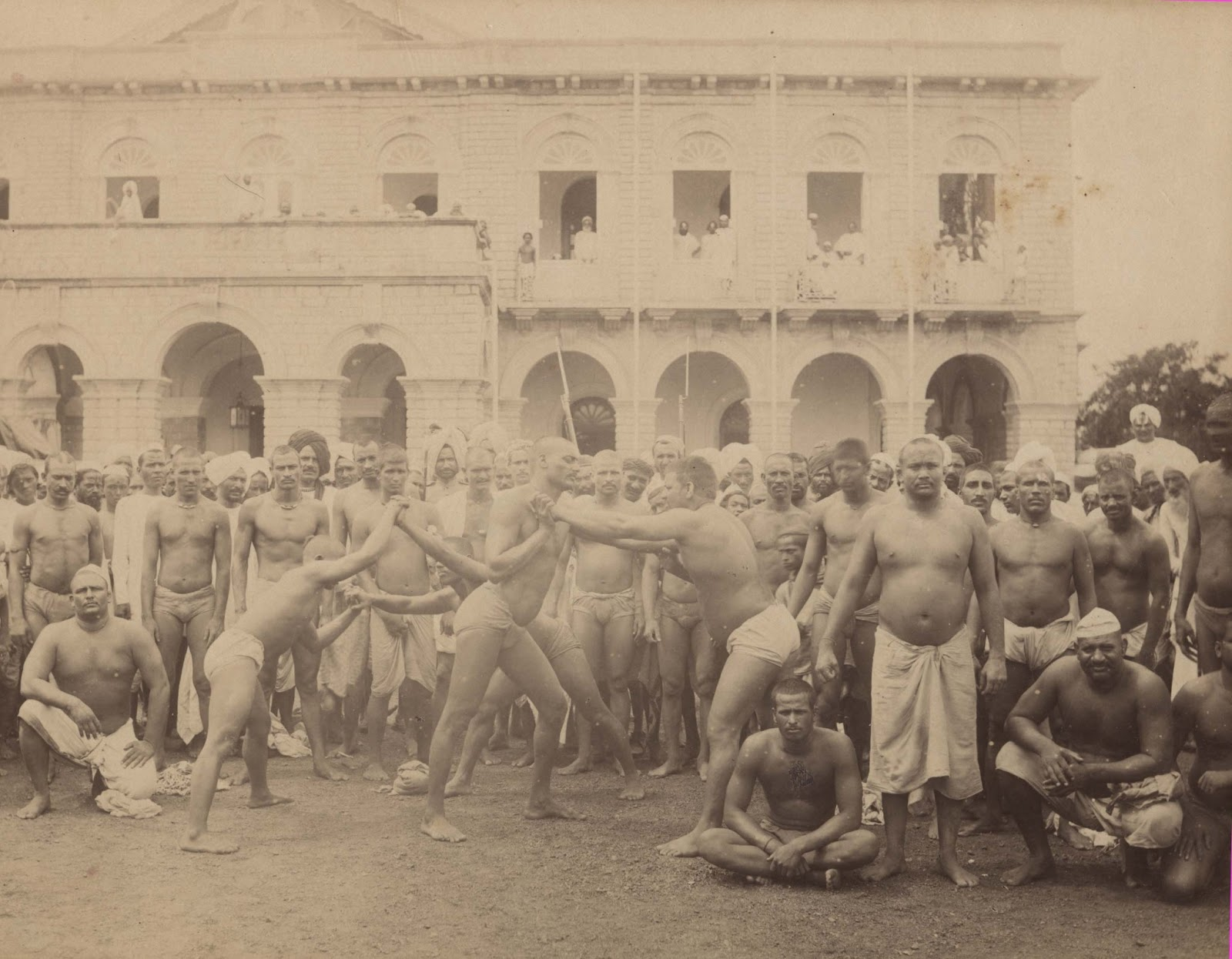
A photo from 1870 depicting Hyderabadis preparing for pehlwani.

During the time of the British Raj, Indians began to focus more on playing British sports such as cricket, hockey, and football rather than their traditional sports. Part of the reason behind this was so that they could rise up the ranks by imitating the culture of the colonisers; later on, some Indians also started to see British sports as an activity in which they could "beat" their colonisers. The British also at times pushed for the growth of Western physical culture, seeing it as a way to increase the uptake of British culture and values in India, and arguing that Indian men were effeminate and thus needed a more European physical regimen (see Muscular Christianity). This was intertwined with the British promoting the martial race theory, in which the native soldiers that were loyal to the British Empire were seen as brave and well-built for fighting, while the educated dissenters were unfit.

A notable traditional sport which continued to be played during this time was polo, which the British helped to codify and support as an official sport. Some British board games, such as Snakes and Ladders and Ludo, were also inspired by Indian board games.

Some self-funded sports clubs, such as the akharas, vyayamshalas, and kreeda mandals promoted and organized competitions at various levels for traditional games during this time. Various traditional games began to be standardized during this period, and some of them were exhibited at the 1936 Berlin Olympic Games.

=== Contemporary era ===
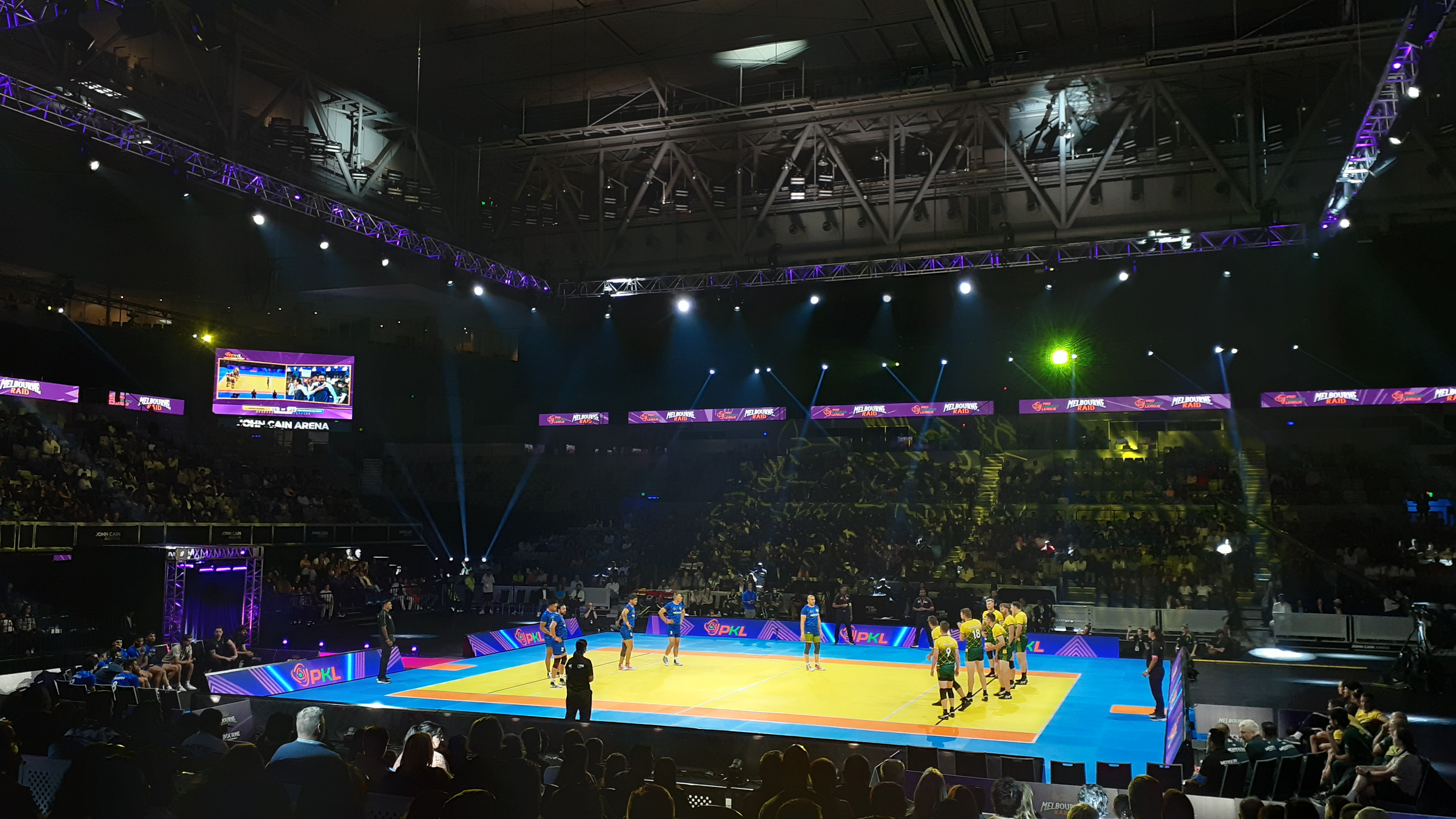
In 2024, the Pro Kabaddi League hosted a "Melbourne Raid", showcasing the game's international growth

In post-Independent India, the traditional sports' popularity has greatly declined with the further growth of Western sports and online gaming. Kabaddi is the most popular traditional sport, with the highest viewership and most career opportunities; its growth was spurred on by the creation of the Pro Kabaddi League. Kabaddi's growth has led to it spreading outside of South Asia as well, with countries such as South Korea and Iran playing it. Kho-kho has also had a franchise league started for it, Ultimate Kho Kho; the Pro Kabaddi League and Ultimate Kho Kho are respectively the most and third-most viewed non-cricket competitions in India.

Whereas in the past, traditional Indian games were often played on mud surfaces in rural areas, in the modern day they are often played on matted surfaces with changes to their rule sets and other aspects of their appearance to make them more appealing and exciting. Some traditional games, such as board games and casino card games, are also being digitalised so that they can be played as video games.

==== Government policy ====
To revive the traditional games, the Indian government started the Bharatiya Khel initiative with the view that these games are more affordable for rural Indians to play, and are important for reviving Indian culture as well as increasing team spirit. Furthermore, in accordance with the National Education Policy (NEP) 2020, 7th-class textbooks have been issued that include content on traditional games. The government is also planning to introduce games like kabaddi and kho-kho into the Olympics if it wins a bid to host a future Olympic event, such as its current bid for the 2036 Olympics. The Fit India movement has also contributed to the revival of traditional Indian games, with schools required to include such games as part of physical education.

== Competitions ==
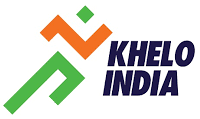
Khelo India is an initiative of the Indian government to organise sports competitions across the nation. Both Khelo India and the National Games of India include several indigenous sports.

At the state level, the Chhattisgarhiya Olympics is an annual Chhattisgarhi competition meant for celebrating traditional games; over 3 million people likely participated in the 2023 edition. The Qila Raipur Sports Festival has been celebrating traditional Punjabi sports since 1933.

== Governance ==
The Association of Traditional Sports and Games, India (ATSGI) was formed in 2020 with the purpose of revitalizing and fostering traditional games and sports, operating under the guidance of the International Council for Traditional Sports and Games (ICTSG) endorsed by UNESCO. Padi Richo, president of the Arunachal Olympic Association, was unanimously elected as president of the ATSGI, with Aman Kumar Sharma in the position of Secretary-General.

== Traditional games ==
=== Gilli danda ===

Gilli danda is similar to many other games around the world, such as the English game of tip-cat, and also has similarities to the British sport of cricket, which is one of the reasons that sport became popular throughout South Asia in the colonial era. It is a game where a player hits a short stick on the ground up into the air using a longer stick held in their hand. They then hit the airborne stick with the hand-held stick again so that it travels as far as possible. If a player on the other team catches the stick before it touches the ground, then the hitter is out (eliminated).

=== Nondi ===
Nondi (known by several other regional names) is a game similar to hopscotch. In it, several connected boxes are drawn on the ground, and players throw a rock or similar object onto one of the boxes and then attempt to hop their way to the box the rock landed in.

== Ball games ==
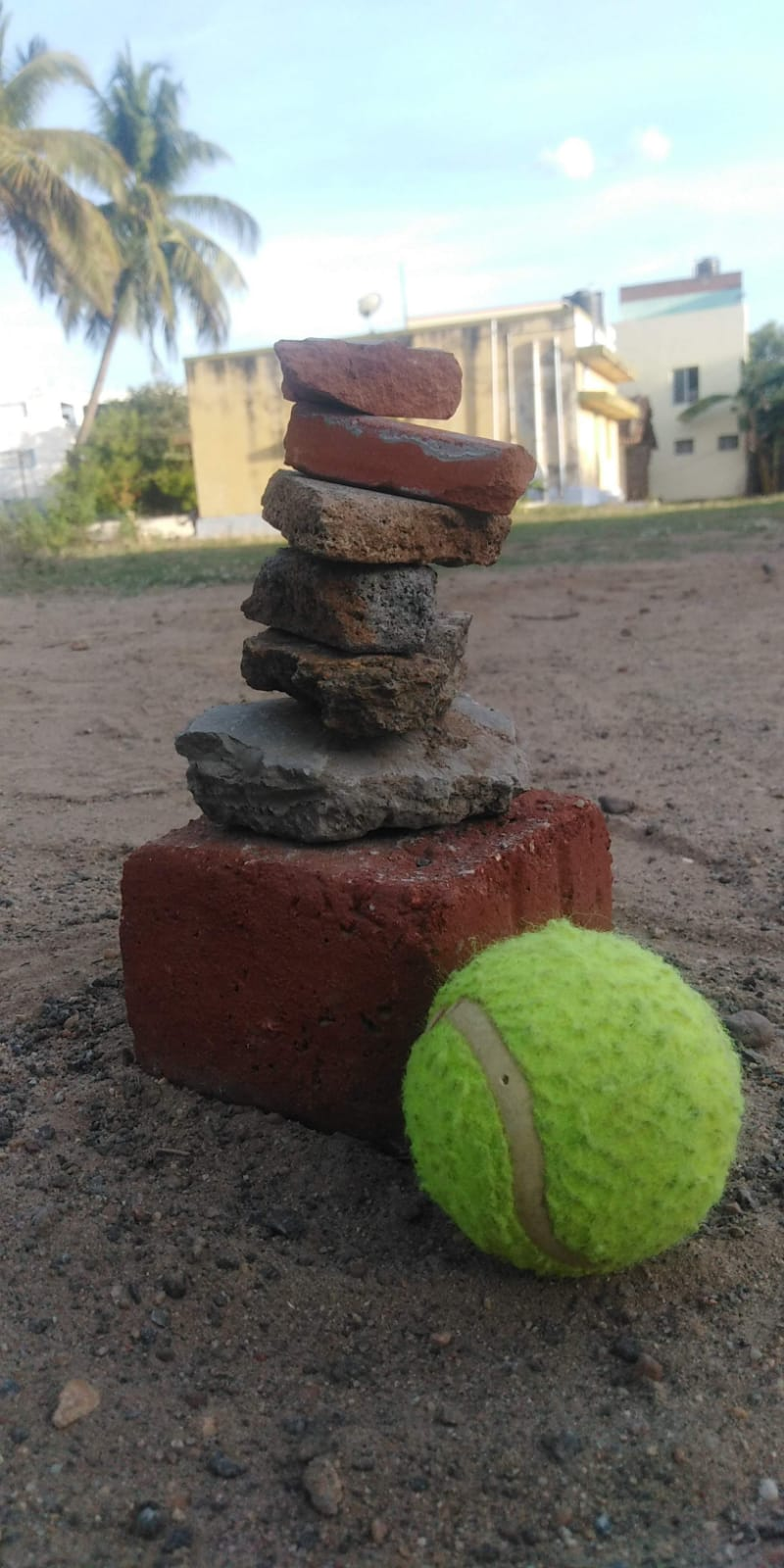
A pile of seven stones and a ball that can be used to play the game of seven stones.

=== Lagori (Seven stones) ===
Gameplay varies based on geography and cultural adaptations, but the fundamental rules are as follows. A member of the attacking team (the seekers) throws a ball at a pile of seven stones in an attempt to knock them over. If a seeker fails to knock over at least one stone within a certain amount of tries, it becomes another team members turn. The objective of the seekers is to try and restore the pile of stones while staying safe from the defending team's (the hitters’) throws. The hitters' objective is to hit or touch the seekers with the ball before they can reconstruct the stone pile. If the ball touches a seeker, that seeker is out and the team which the seeker came from continues, without the seeker. Points are awarded to the seekers if they are able to restack the stone pile and hitters receive points for eliminating the seekers. The round is completed when the stone pile is reconstructed or the hitters eliminate all of the seekers.

=== Maram pitti ===
Maram Pitti, also known as Picchi Banti (పిచ్చి బంతి) in Telugu, is an Indian version of dodgeball. It is played with a rubber ball or tennis ball and is often played by a small group, usually 5-6 players, in a small enclosed area or bylanes. The game can also be played solo, in pairs, or in teams of 3 or more players.

=== Ball badminton ===
Ball badminton is a sport native to India. It is a racket sport game, played with a yellow ball made of wool, on a court of fixed dimensions (12 by 24 metres) divided by a net. The game was played as early as 1856 by the royal family in Tanjore, the capital of Thanjavur district in Tamil Nadu, India. It enjoys the greatest popularity in India. Ball badminton is a fast-paced game; it demands skill, quick reflexes, good judgment, agility, and the ability to control the ball with one's wrist.

== Games involving simple objects ==
=== Marbles ===
Some Indian games involving marbles are also known as Kancha/Kanche or Golli Gundu. Several games are played involving players flicking marbles at other marbles, often in order to "capture" as many marbles as possible by the end of the game to win.

=== Gutte ===
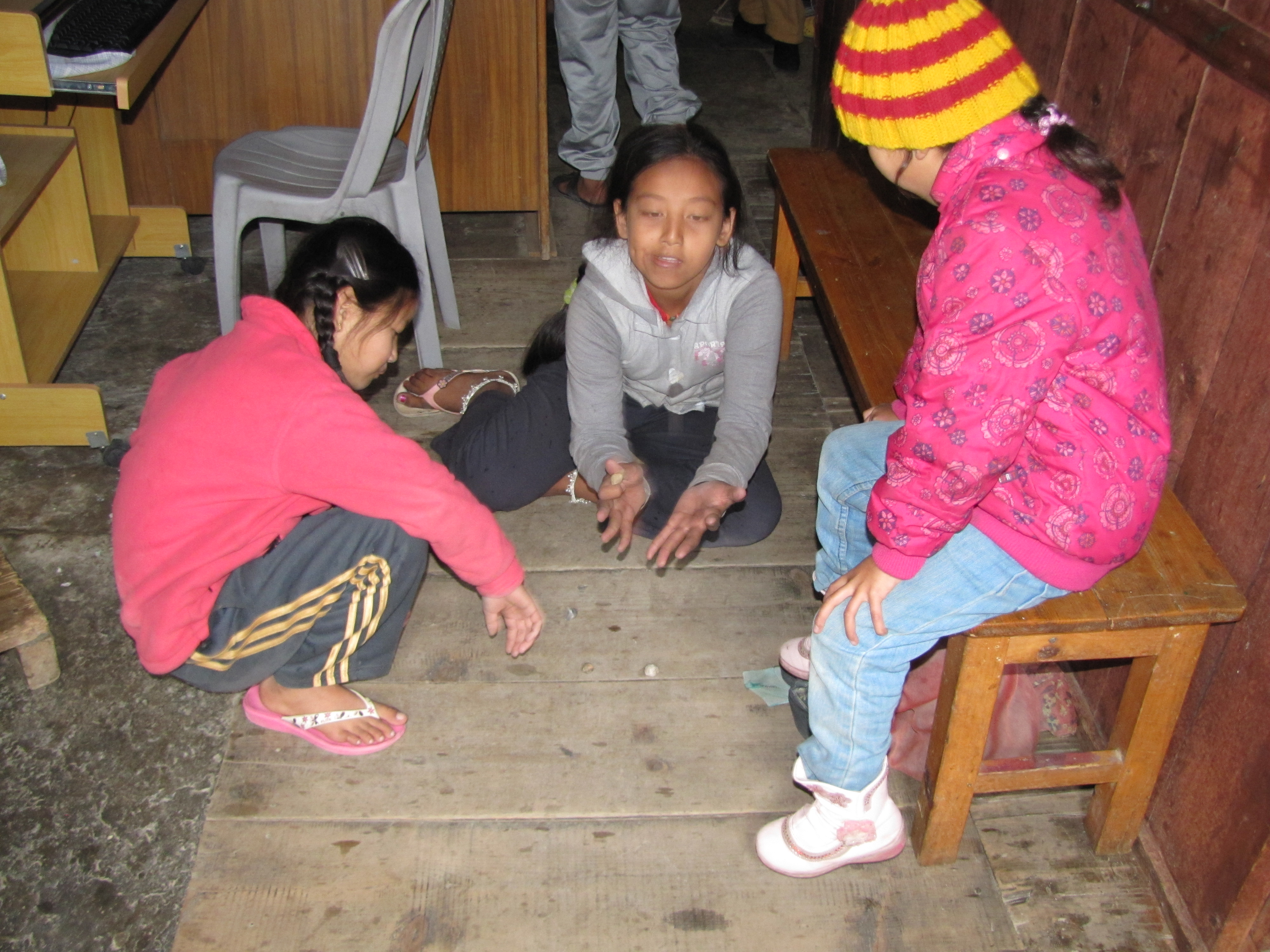
Children in Nepal playing astragaloi

In India, the game is called anju kal in Tamil and panchguti/pansguti (পাঁচগুটি) in Bengali and Assamese ("5 stones"). It is played with 5–7 stones. It is played between two or more players in turn. The game is played in five rounds. Generally for first four rounds four stones are thrown on the floor. The first round is to pick up four stones one by one. The second round is to pick two stones at a time. The third round is to pick three stones together and then pick one. The fourth round is to pick all four in one go. The last round is to toss all the stones from palm and place it on the back of the palm and then catch all four by tossing to above.

== Variations of tag ==
There are several Indian variations of the game of tag (sometimes referred to in India as "running and catching" or in Hindi, pakdam pakdai), with kabaddi and kho-kho being the two most popular such games and being played in professional leagues (Pro Kabaddi League and Ultimate Kho Kho respectively).

=== Deciding who the denner is ===
In many Indian variations of tag, the player who is supposed to tag the other players is referred to as the "denner". There are a number of ways of determining which player should be the denner; one such method is Saa Boo Three (also known as pugam pugai), in which three players face one of their hands either up or down, and if one of them faces their hand the opposite direction of the other two, then that player is the denner.

=== Kabaddi ===
Kabaddi (Note: Pronunciation: /kəˈbædi/, or /ˈkʌbədi/) is a contact sport played between two teams of seven players each. During the game, a lone member of one team ("raider") enters the opposite half of the court and tries to tag members of the opposition team ("defenders") without being tackled. In a single raid, often lasting a maximum 30 seconds, points are awarded for successful tags if the raider does not get out, while defenders earn a point if the raider is tackled, goes out of bounds or timed out. Tagged or tackled players temporarily step out of the game and can be revived when the team scores points. Raids alternate between the teams throughout the game.

There are several variations of the sport though the two major forms are the standard style, played on a rectangular court, that is part of international competitions such as the Asian Games, and circle style (also called Punjabi kabaddi), played on a circular field.

=== Kho-kho ===
Kho kho is a traditional Indian sport that dates to ancient India. It is one of the most popular traditional tag games in the Indian subcontinent after kabaddi. Kho kho is played on a rectangular court with a central lane connecting two poles at either end of the court. During the game, nine players from the chasing team (attacking team) are on the field, with eight of them sitting (crouched) in the central lane, while three runners from the defending team run around the court and try to avoid being touched or caught. Each sitting player on the chasing team faces the opposite half of the field.

In the game, one player from the chasing team (the "active chaser" or "attacker") may run around the court to tag (touch) members of the defending team. Each successful tag earns one point, and tagged defenders must leave the field. However, the active chaser is restricted from crossing the central lane to access the other half of the court and cannot change direction once they begin running toward either pole. These restrictions can be bypassed if the active chaser either switches roles with a sitting teammate — by touching them on the back while saying "Kho" — who is facing the other half of the court, or by running behind either pole to switch direction or halves. Each team alternates between scoring and defending, with two turns for each role. Each turn lasts nine minutes, and the team with the highest score at the end of the game wins.

The sport is widely played across South Asia, and also has a presence in other regions with a significant South Asian diaspora, such as South Africa and England. It is played most often by school children, and is also a competitive sport. The first franchise league for the sport, Ultimate Kho Kho, was unveiled in India in August 2022, and the inaugural World Cup was held in 2025.

=== Langdi ===
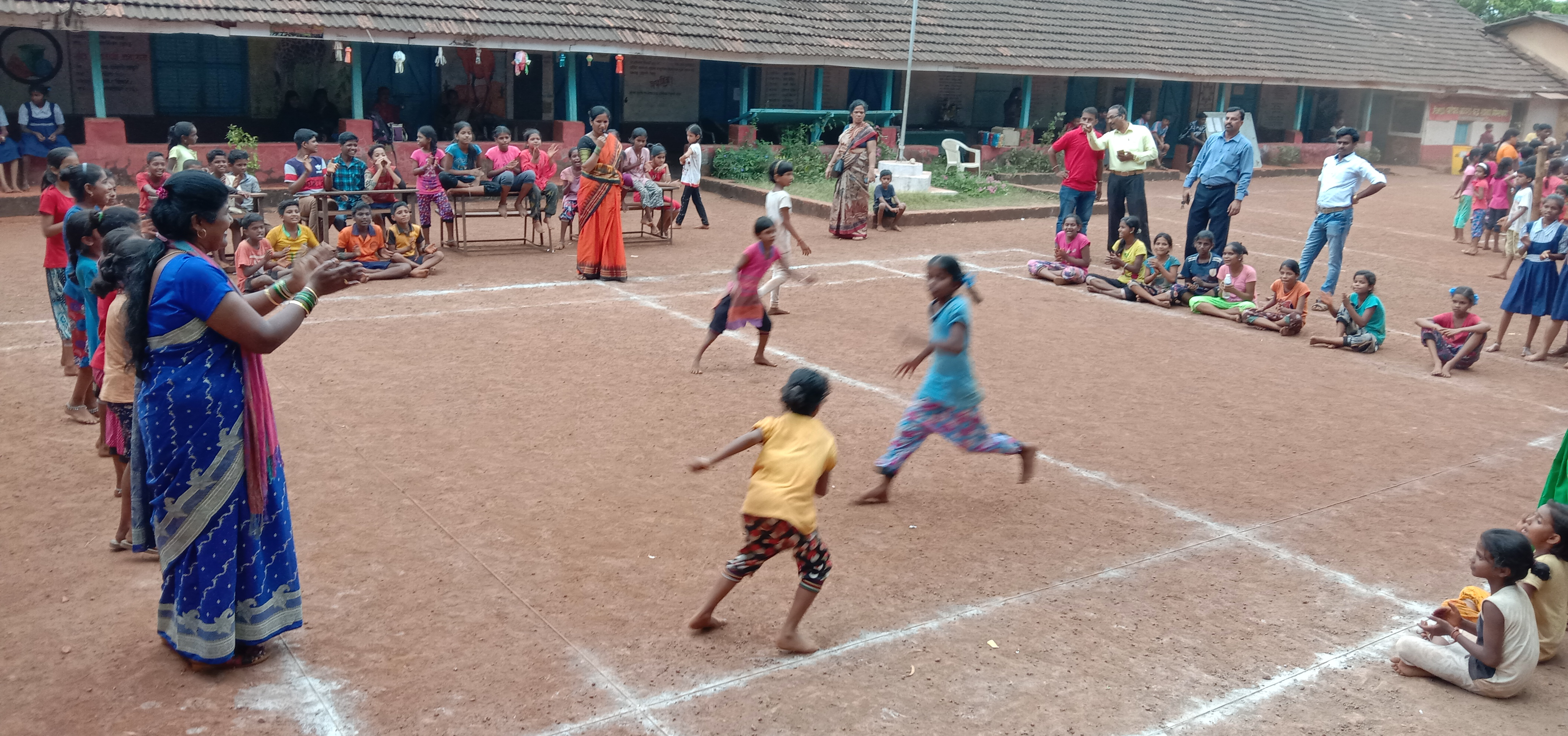
School kids play langdi during a inter-school competition

Langdi (Note: (Hindi: लंगड़ी) Also sometimes spelled Langadi.) is a traditional South Asian field sport which combines elements of tag and hopscotch. It was originally played during the Pandiyan Dynasty and called "Nondiyaattam" at that time. The teams alternate chasing (attacking) and defending roles in each of the 4 innings of the game, with the chasing team's players restricted to hopping around on one foot, and attempting to score points by tagging as many defenders as possible within the 9 minutes of each inning. It is described by Marathis as a sport with a Marathi ethos.

Langdi is considered to be useful in training for sports like kho kho, volleyball and gymnastics. The National Langdi Federation received national recognition in 2010.

=== Atya-patya ===
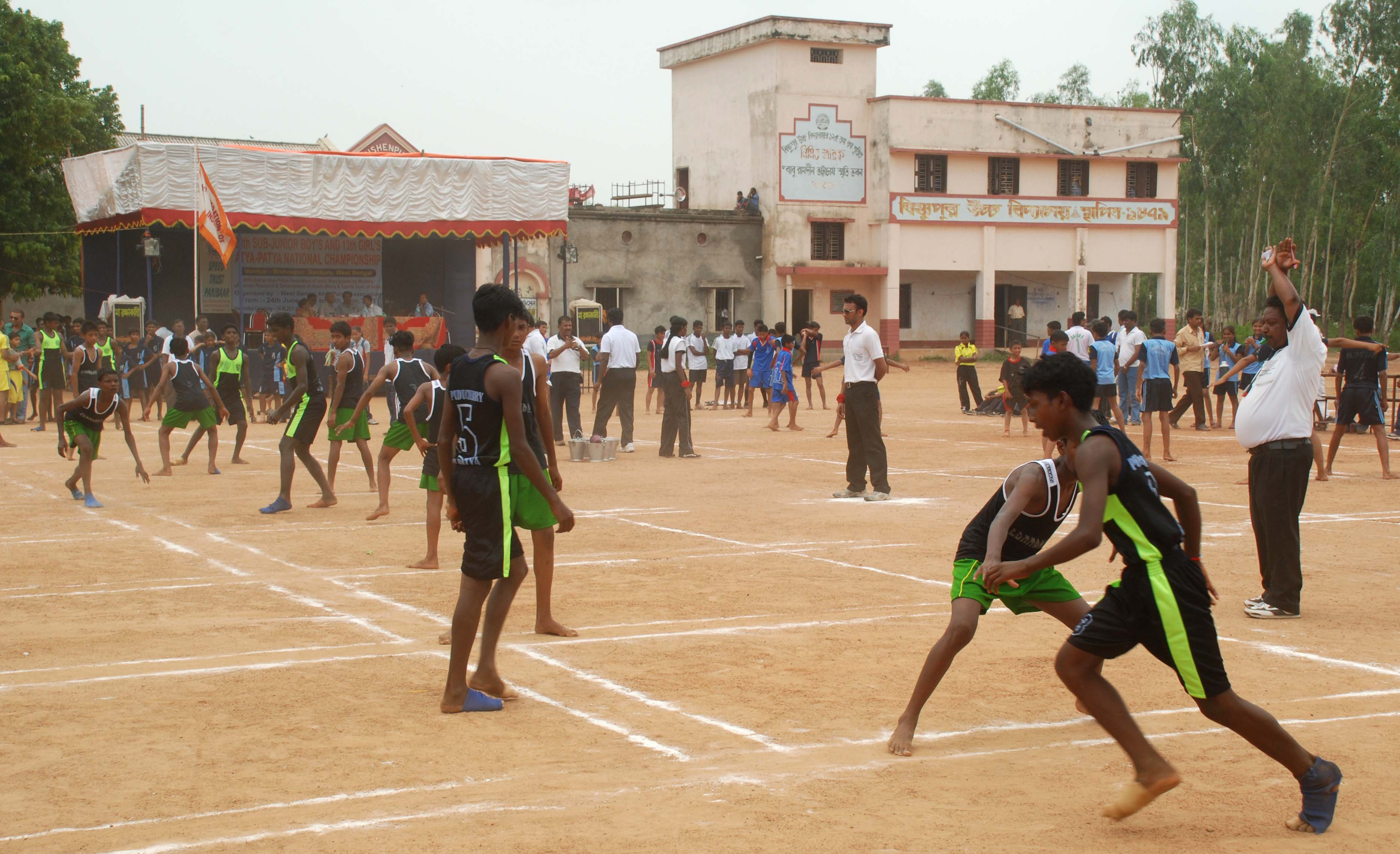

Atya patya (Marathi: आट्यापाट्या) is a traditional South Asian tag sport played by two sides of nine players. It is more popular in rural areas of India. It is more commonly played in Maharashtra, a western Indian state. Atya patya is described as a "game of feints". The playing area comprises nine trenches, coming out of either side of a central trench; a point is awarded to the attacking team's players for each trench they cross without being tagged by the defensive players within the trenches. The game ends after 4 innings (scoring turns) of 7 minutes each, with each team having two innings to score. It has been described as a game of "militant chase". The sport is played in a relatively small area and requires no equipment, similar to other games indigenous to India such as kabaddi, seven stones, kho kho, gillidanda and langdi.

=== Chor Police ===
Chor Police (transl. Thief and Police), also known as Chor Sipahi, is an outdoor role-playing game played by children in the Indian subcontinent. The game is usually played by children divided into two teams with no limit of players. One team acts as police and another one acts as thieves within a narrative. Police players chase chor (thieves) in an attempt to catch and mark them defeated.

=== Oonch Neech ===
In Oonch Neech if the denner (tagger) says neech (down), all players have to go to an elevated area. If he says oonch (up) then all players have to stay down. Whatever the denner picks, he has to stay on that platform.

=== Dog and the bone ===
In Dog and the Bone (known by various names in India, such as "Cheel Jhapatta", and more commonly in other parts of the world as "steal the bacon"), there is an object placed in the centre of the field, with two teams placed on opposite ends of the field. One player from each team rushes towards the object to try to take it back to their team; a point is scored either if a player successfully retrieves the object, or if a player tags an opponent who is holding the object before the opponent safely makes it back.

=== River or mountain ===
River or mountain, which is known as Nadi ki Pahad in Hindi, and Nadee-Parvat in Marathi and other regional languages, is a game where the field is divided into areas referred to as "rivers" and "mountains". At the start of play, the denner shouts out either "river" or "mountain", with all players then attempting to go to the areas referred to by the denner. While outside of those areas, the players can be tagged and eliminated by the denner.

=== Surr ===
Surr playing field

The game is played on a rectangular field, divided into four equal quadrants, by two teams of two to four players each. The attacking team gathers in one quadrant, and the defending team gathers along the quadrant's borders with the adjoining quadrants. The objective of the attacking team is to enter the other quadrants without being touched by the players of the defending team. If all the members of the attacking team manage to enter all the quadrants, the attacking team wins, and its members shout "Bol Den Goivan Surr!". In an Awadhi variation, they sing "Bol Goiyan Banva Surr" ("बोल गोइयां बणवा सुर्र"); if they are touched by the defending team, they lose, and have to stand on the quadrant line as "thieves", and have to sing another phrase.

=== Saakli (Chain tag) ===
Chain tag involves the denner tagging other players, who are then required to form a chain with the denner by holding hands. Only the two players at either end of the chain can tag the remaining players (since they have a free hand not trapped in the chain.) The game ends once all players are part of the chain.

=== Lock and key ===
Also known as Vish-Amrit/Vish-Amrut (Poison-Antidote), lock and key is similar to the Western game of freeze tag, in which the denner(s) can "freeze" opponents by tagging them, with the frozen players' teammates able to "unfreeze" them by tagging them. A unique feature of lock and key is that players may be required to shout out "lock" or "key", as appropriate, when tagging other players.

=== Aankh micholi ===
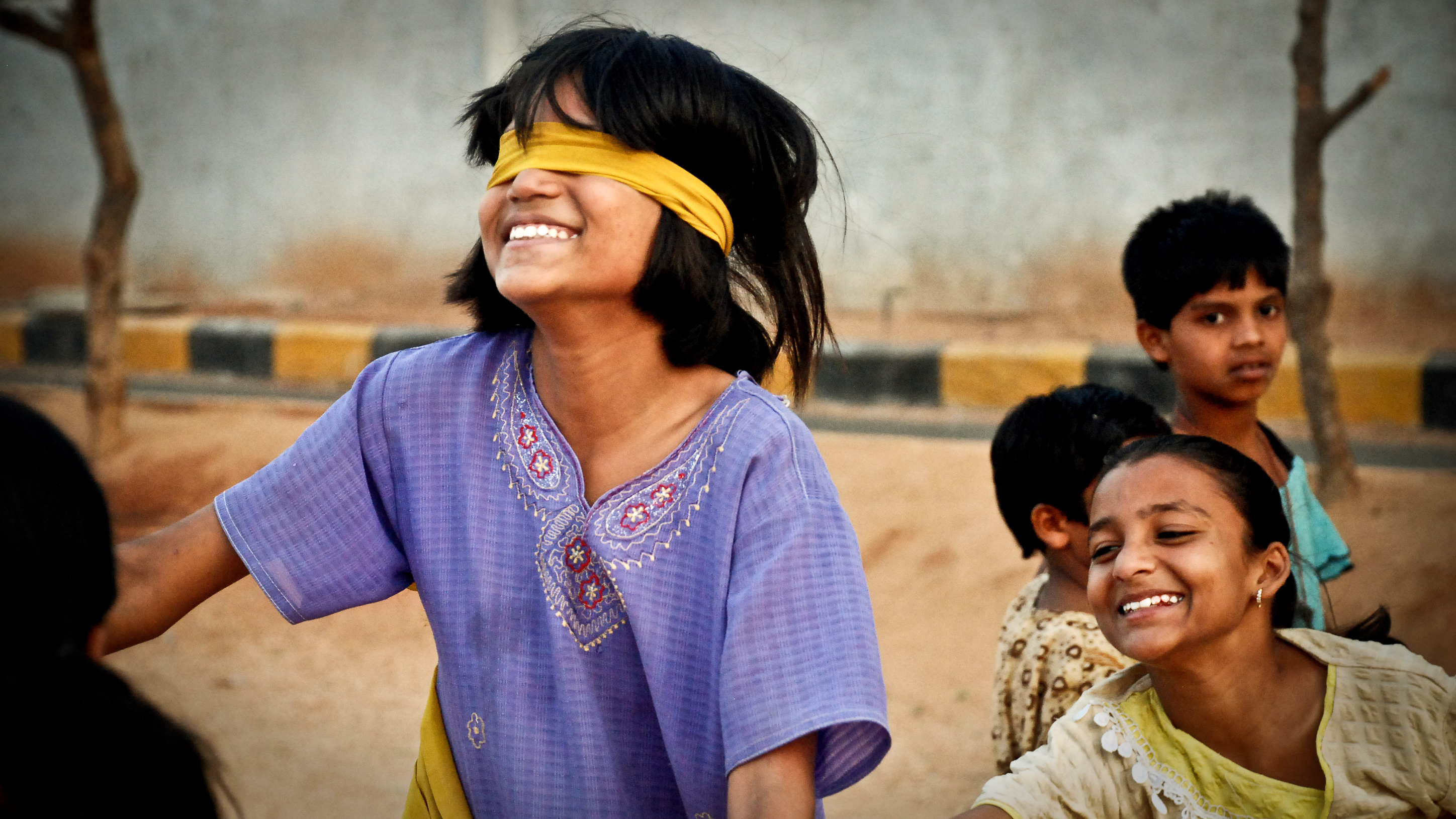
Blindfolded player in Aankh micholi

Aankh micholi is the Hindi name for blind man's buff (blindfolded tag).

=== Kokla chappaki ===
One player goes around all the other players, who sit in a circle, and eventually drops a handkerchief behind one of them. That player must grab the cloth and then attempt to tag the first player.

=== Four corners ===
Players attempt to run between the four corners of a square without being tagged by the denner, who is in the middle of the square. In a Telugu variation of the game, Nalugu Stambalata, there is a pole in each corner of the square that the players must touch. In Maharashtra, the game is known as "Khamb-Khambolya".

=== Gella-Chutt ===
Gella-Chutt (transl. "the king ran away") is a traditional Indian game from Tripura. In the game, one team has a king stationed in a "prison", which is at a distance from the "home" area. The goal of the king is to reach home with the help of his teammates ("guards") without being tagged by the opponents.

=== Tree-climbing monkey ===
The denner tries to tag players who can climb up trees to escape; these players can try to touch a stick kept within a circle on the ground in order to become safe from the denner. Variants of this game are also known as "Surparambya" or "Surparambi".

==== Labbo-Daal ====
Also known as "kiss the stick" or "Soljhapta" in Bengali, this variation of tree-climbing monkey sees the denner attempting to rush back to kiss the stick after tagging another player, while the other players try to thwart the denner by picking the stick up and throwing it away before the denner can kiss it.

=== Chappa-pani ===
Players who are squatting can't be tagged by the denner in this game, but they can only stand up when touched by other players who are standing up. This game is also known as Uthali.

=== Limbdi-pipali ===
Players can avoid being tagged in this game by climbing a tree. (Note: The name of the game refers to the limbdi and pipali trees.)

=== Vagh-bakri ===
One player is the "shepherd", and all but one of the players, known as "lambs" or "goats", form a chain behind the shepherd by grabbing each other's waists. The lambs are required to remain in this chain formation. The last player (the "tiger") has to try to capture the lambs by getting around the shepherd, who is allowed to move around. Once a lamb is tagged, they become the new tiger and play restarts.

== Board games ==
Indian board games have a long history, and have been found etched into the floors and surfaces of ancient temples throughout the country.

=== Carrom ===
A 'scissors grip' carrom shot.

Carrom is a popular tabletop game in India, enjoyed by people of all ages. Its roots can be traced back to the Indian subcontinent, where it has evolved into a major competitive sport with organized tournaments and federations. Played across households, clubs, and competitions, carrom has grown from being a casual family game to a recognized sport in India and around the world.

=== Chaturanga ===
Chaturanga (Sanskrit: चतुरङ्ग, IAST: caturaṅga, pronounced [tɕɐt̪uˈɾɐŋɡɐ]) is an ancient Indian strategy board game. It is first known from India around the seventh century CE.

=== Pachisi ===
Pachisi (/pəˈtʃiːzi/, Hindustani: [pəˈtʃiːsiː]) is a cross and circle board game that originated in Ancient India. It is described in the ancient text Mahabharata under the name of "Pasha". It is played on a board shaped like a symmetrical cross. A player's pieces move around the board based upon a throw of six or seven cowrie shells as lots, with the number of shells resting with the aperture upward indicating the number of spaces to move.

In addition to chaupar, there are similar games that have originated around the world. Barjis (barsis) is popular in the Levant, mainly Syria, while Parchís is another game popular in Spain and northern Morocco. Parqués is its Colombian equivalent. Parcheesi, Patchesi, Sorry!, and Ludo are among the commercial versions of similar games. The jeu des petits chevaux ('game of little horses') is played in France, and Mensch ärgere Dich nicht is a popular German cross-and-circle game.

=== Lambs and tigers ===
The lambs and tigers game, locally referred as the game of goats and tigers (Telugu: Puli-mē̃ka āṭa, Tamil: Āḍu-puli āṭṭam, Kannada: Āḍu-huli āṭa), is a strategic, two-player (or 2 teams) leopard hunt game that is played in south India. The game is asymmetric in that one player controls three tigers and the other player controls up to 15 lambs/goats. The tigers 'hunt' the goats while the goats attempt to block the tigers' movements.

=== Snakes and ladders ===
Snakes and ladders is a board game for two or more players regarded today as a worldwide classic. The game originated in ancient India as Moksha Patam ('liberation lesson'), and was brought to the United Kingdom in the 1890s. It is played on a game board with numbered, gridded squares. A number of "ladders" and "snakes" are pictured on the board, each connecting two specific board squares. The object of the game is to navigate one's game piece, according to die rolls, from the start (bottom square) to the finish (top square), helped by climbing ladders but hindered by sliding down snakes.

=== Snooker ===
Snooker (pronounced UK: /ˈsnuːkər/ SNOO-kər, US: /ˈsnʊkər/ SNUUK-ər) is a cue sport played on a rectangular billiards table covered with a green cloth called baize, with six pockets: one at each corner and one in the middle of each long side. First played by British Army officers stationed in India in the second half of the 19th century, the game is played with 22 balls: a white cue ball, 15 reds and six colours – yellow, green, brown, blue, pink and black. Using a snooker cue, players take turns to strike the cue ball to pot other balls in a defined sequence, scoring points for each pot and for fouls committed by the opposing player. An individual frame of snooker is won by the player who has scored the most points, and a snooker match ends when a player wins a predetermined number of frames.

=== Pallanguzhi ===
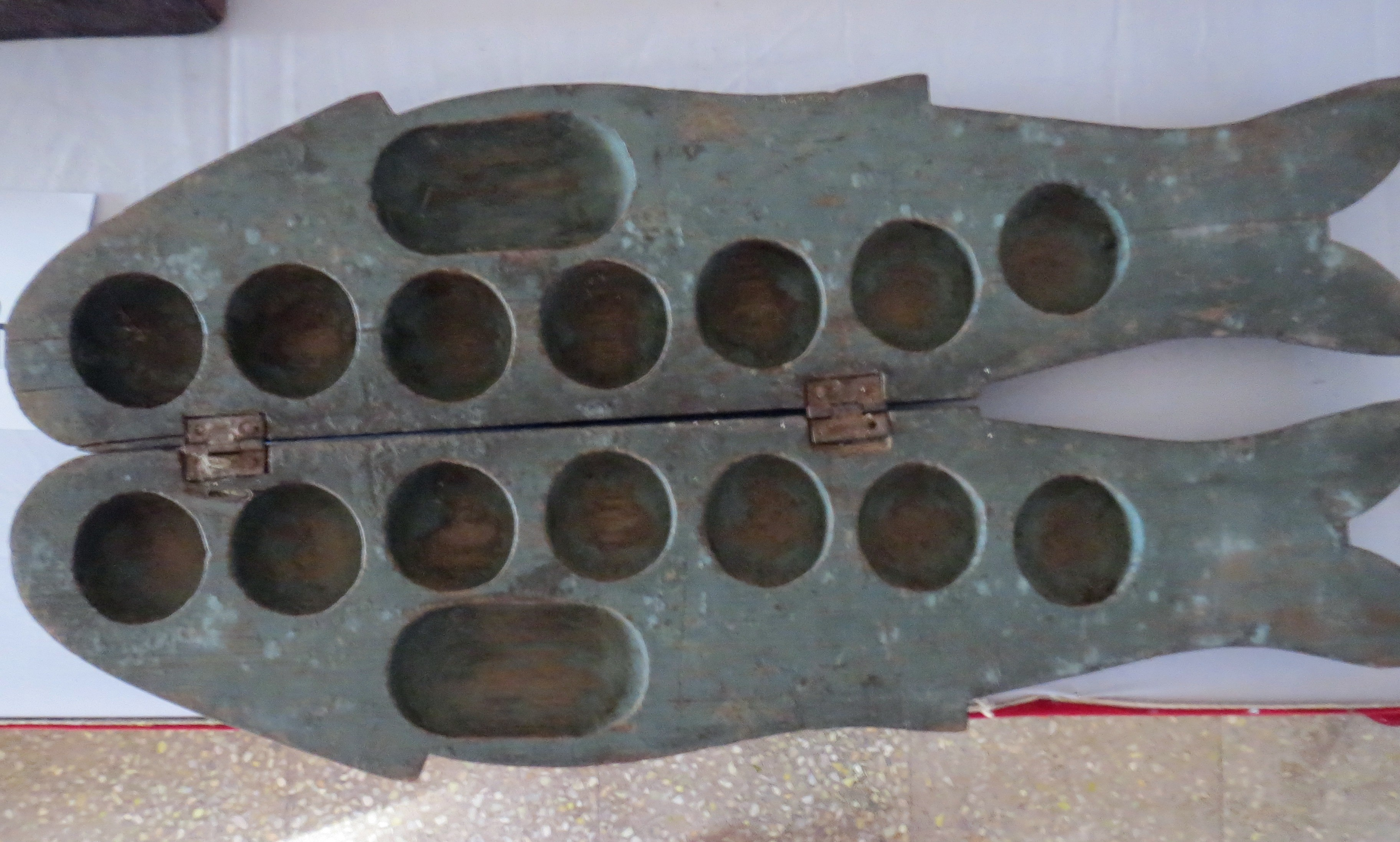
A fish shaped pallankuli board

Pallanguli, or Pallankuli (Tamil: பல்லாங்குழி, romanized: Pallāṅkuḻi, Malayalam: പല്ലാങ്കുഴി, romanized: Pallāṅkuḻi, Kannada: ಅಳಗುಳಿ ಮನೆ, romanized: Alaguli Mane, Telugu: వామన గుంటలు, romanized: Vamana guntalu, Odia: କଶାଡ଼ି, romanized: Kasāṛi, Marathi: सत्कोलि, romanized: Satkoli), is a traditional ancient mancala game played in South India, especially Tamil Nadu and Kerala. This game was later introduced to Karnataka and Andhra Pradesh in India, as well as Sri Lanka and Malaysia. The game is played by two players, with a wooden board that has fourteen pits in all (hence, it is also called fourteen pits, or pathinālam kuḻi. There have been several variations in the layout of the pits, one among them being seven pits on each player's side. The pits contain cowry shells, seeds or small pebbles used as counters. There are several variations of the game depending on the number of shells each player starts with.

== Card games ==
=== Ganjifa ===
Ganjifa, Ganjapa or Gânjaphâ, is a card game and type of playing cards that are most associated with Persia and India. After Ganjifa cards fell out of use in Iran before the twentieth century, India became the last country to produce them. The form prevalent in Odisha is Ganjapa.

=== Teen patti ===
Teen patti (Hindi) or Tre Patte (Punjabi), (meaning 'three cards' in English) is a gambling card game. Teen Patti originated in India and is popular throughout South Asia. It originated in the English game of three-card brag, with influences from poker. It is also called flush or flash in some areas.

The game has its advantages and a culturally determined tie to Janmashtami, the celebration of Krishna’s birth.

== Boat racing ==
=== Vallam kali ===
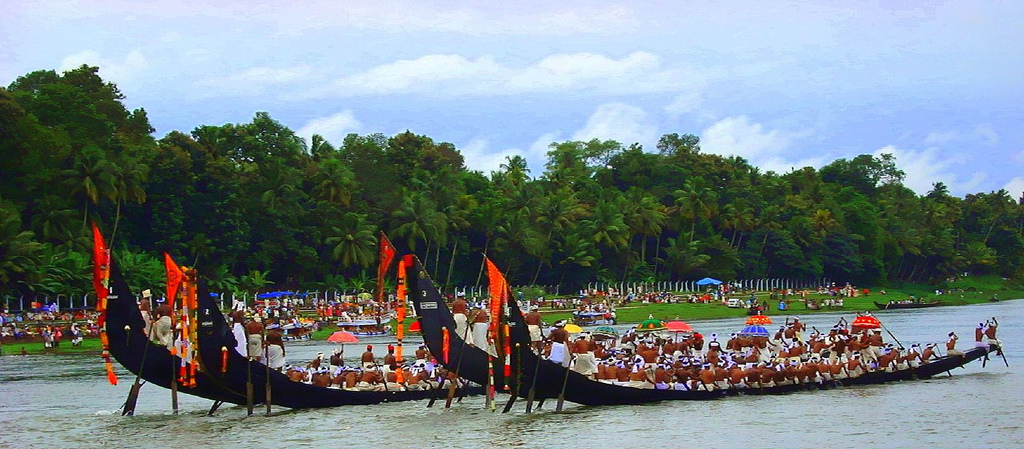
Aranmula Boat in Uthrattathi Boat Race

Vallam kali (vaḷḷaṃ kaḷi, literally: "boat game"), also known as snake boat race, is a traditional boat race held in the Punnamada Lake of Kerala, India. It is a form of canoe racing and uses paddled war canoes. These races typically take place during the monsoon season, from July to September, and are closely associated with the Onam festival.

=== Hiyang Tannaba ===
Hiyang Tannaba (Meitei: ꯍꯤꯌꯥꯡ ꯇꯥꯟꯅꯕ, lit. 'boat race') is a traditional boat race ceremony performed in Manipur, India as a part of the religious festival of Lai Haraoba. It is generally organized in the month of November at many places including Thangapat (moat). The boats called Hiyang Hiren are regarded as invested with spiritual powers and the game is associated with religious rites. The Meiteis believe that the worship of the Hiyang Hiren will bring protection from evil spirits.

== Events involving animals ==
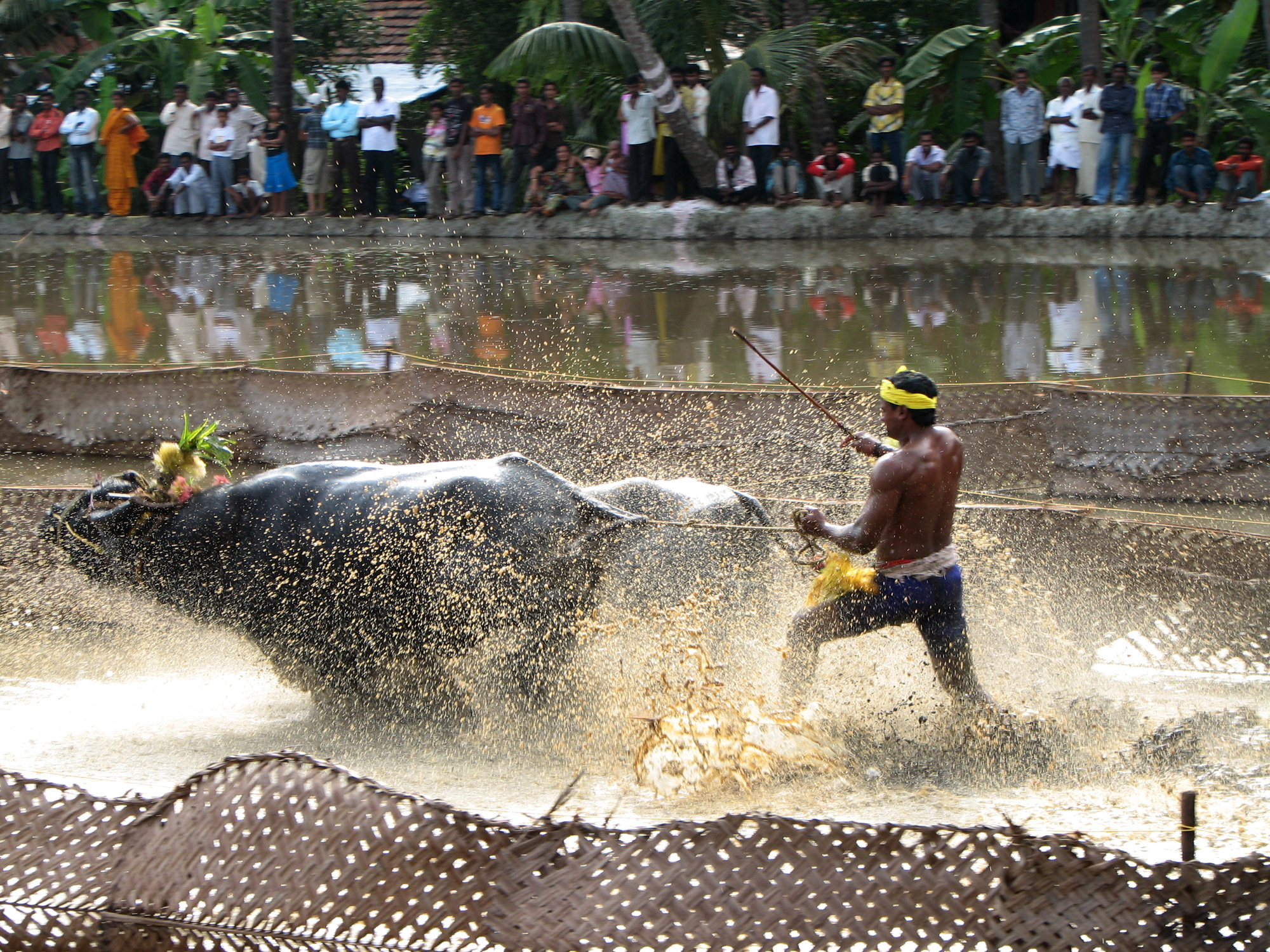
A Kambala participant driving his two bulls forward.

=== Kambala ===
Kambala involves one person racing a pair of bulls across a paddy field.

=== Jallikattu ===
Jallikattu (or Sallikkattu), also known as Eru Taḻuvuṭal and Manju-virattu, is a traditional event in which a zebu bull (Bos indicus), such as the Pulikulam or Kangayam breeds, is released into a crowd of people, and many people attempt to grab the large hump on the bull's back with both arms and hang on to it while the bull attempts to escape. They hold the hump for as long as possible, attempting to bring the bull to a stop. In some cases, they must ride long enough to remove flags on the bull's horns or cross a finish line.

Jallikattu is typically practised in some regions of the Indian state of Tamil Nadu, specifically in southern Tamil Nadu, as a part of Pongal celebrations on Mattu Pongal day, which occurs annually in January.

=== Polo ===
Polo is a mallet and ball game that is played on ponyback on an English style riding as a traditional field sport, and is one of the oldest known team sports in the world.

== Miscellaneous games ==
=== Antakshari ===
Antakshari, also known as Antyakshari (अंताक्षरी transl. The game of the ending letter) is a spoken parlor game played in India. Each contestant sings the first verse of a song (often Classical Hindustani or Bollywood songs) that begins with the consonant of Hindi alphabet on which the previous contestant's song ended.

=== Kite-flying ===
Fighter kites are known as patang (Hindi: पतंग) in India. Kite flying takes place mainly during specific festivals, particularly the spring festival known as Vasant Panchami, during Makar Sankranti and, more recently, on Indian Independence Day.

=== Panja (arm wrestling) ===
Arm wrestling (also spelled "armwrestling") is a strength sport in which two participants, facing each other with their bent elbows placed on a flat surface (usually a table) and hands firmly gripped, each attempt to "pin" their opponent's hand by forcing it to the surface. In popular culture, arm wrestling is commonly interpreted as a display of physical dominance, symbolizing superior strength and toughness between two individuals.

Arm wrestling is a popular pastime in India, with India having a professional arm wrestling competition known as the Pro Panja League.

=== Raja Mantri Chor Sipahi ===
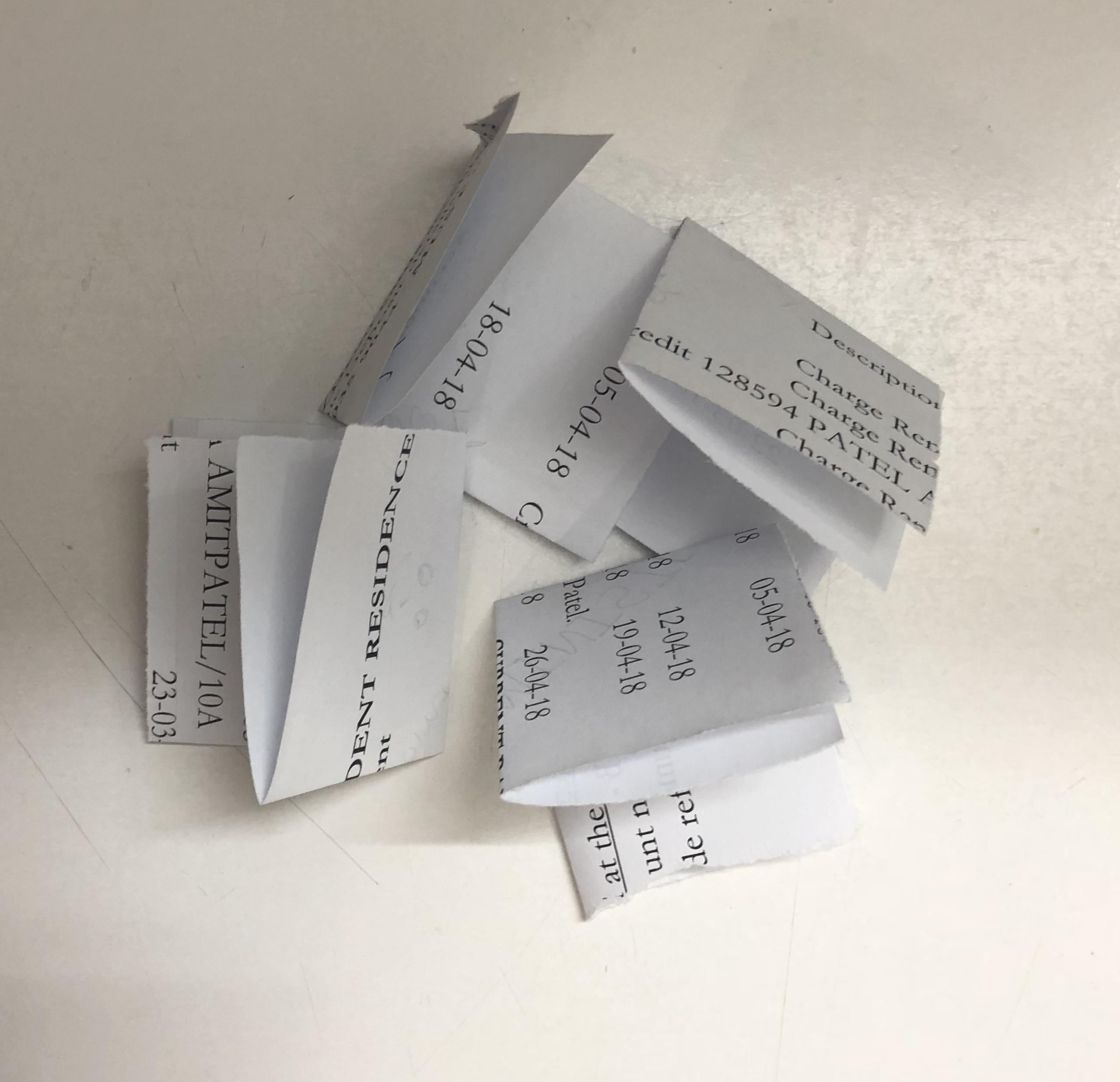
Shuffled chits

Raja Mantri Chor Sipahi (transl. King, Minister, thief and soldier) is a type of role-playing game that is a popular pastime in India. It involves four players—each player takes up the role of either the king, Minister, thief or soldier— and the Soldier (Sipahi) has to guess the identity of the thief. Along with other such games, its popularity has decreased in the 21st century.

== Toys ==
=== Bhatukali ===
Bhatukali involves children playing with a mock set of kitchen items, with the intention of being taught how to do kitchen-related work. Bhatukali dates back to ancient times, as evidenced by its presence in literary works such as the Dnyaneshwari and Kama Sutra.

=== Dug dugi ===
Dug dugi is a type of rattle for children to play with. A dug dugi has a core with strings on either side attached to small stone-like objects; once the dug dugi is shaken, the stones hit the core from either side to make sound.

=== Gulel ===
Children often play with a slingshot (gulel in Hindi), which traditionally was also used for hunting purposes.

=== Pambaram ===
Pambaram is a traditional throwing top game played in India and Bangladesh.

== Regional games ==
=== Yubi lakpi ===
Yubi lakpi (coconut football) is a seven-a-side traditional football game played in Manipur, India, using a coconut, which has some notable similarities to rugby. Despite these similarities, the name is not related to the game of rugby or Rugby School in England, it is in fact of Meitei-Pangal origin, and means literally "coconut snatching". Emma Levine, an English writer on little known Asian sports, speculates:

"Perhaps this was the root of modern rugby? Most Manipuris are quite adamant that the modern world 'stole' the idea from them and made it into rugby... this game, which has been around for centuries, is so similar to rugby, which evolved a great deal later, that it must be more than a coincidence."

=== Dhopkhel ===
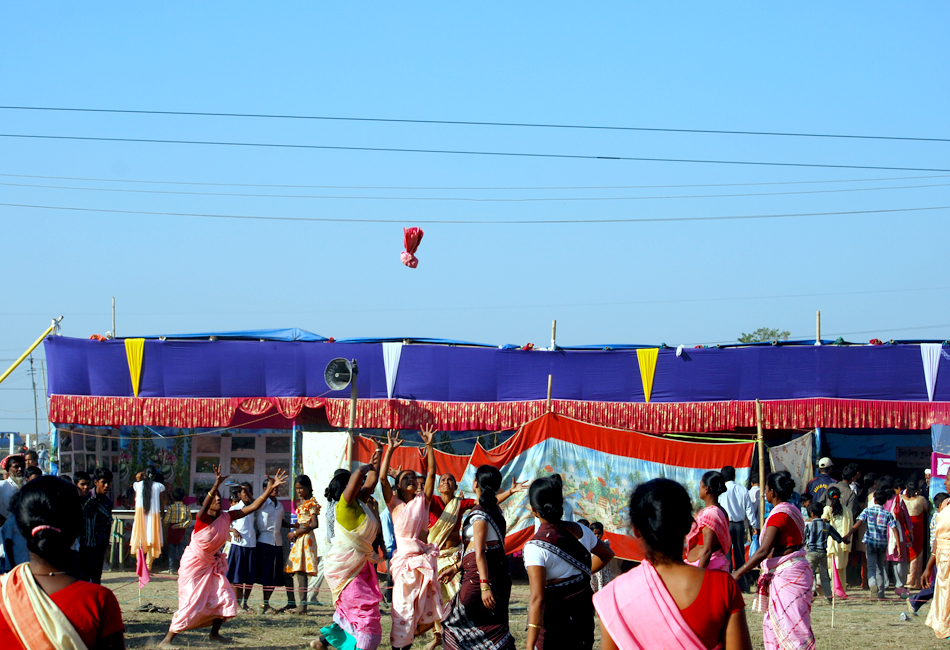
Dhopkhel is played by both indigenous Assamese men and women

Dhopkhel, also transliterated dhop khel and dhoop khel (Assamese: ঢোপখেল), is a traditional ball game played in the Indian state of Assam. The game is played between two teams of 11 on a 125 m × 80 m field bounded by four flags. The players take turns throwing the ball at the opponent to knock them out of the game, while seeking to catch the ball and avoid being tagged by other players. It is a test of speed, stamina, and acrobatic skills.

== See also ==
- Indian physical culture
- History of India
- List of Indian inventions and discoveries
