= Carrom in India =

Indian tabletop game

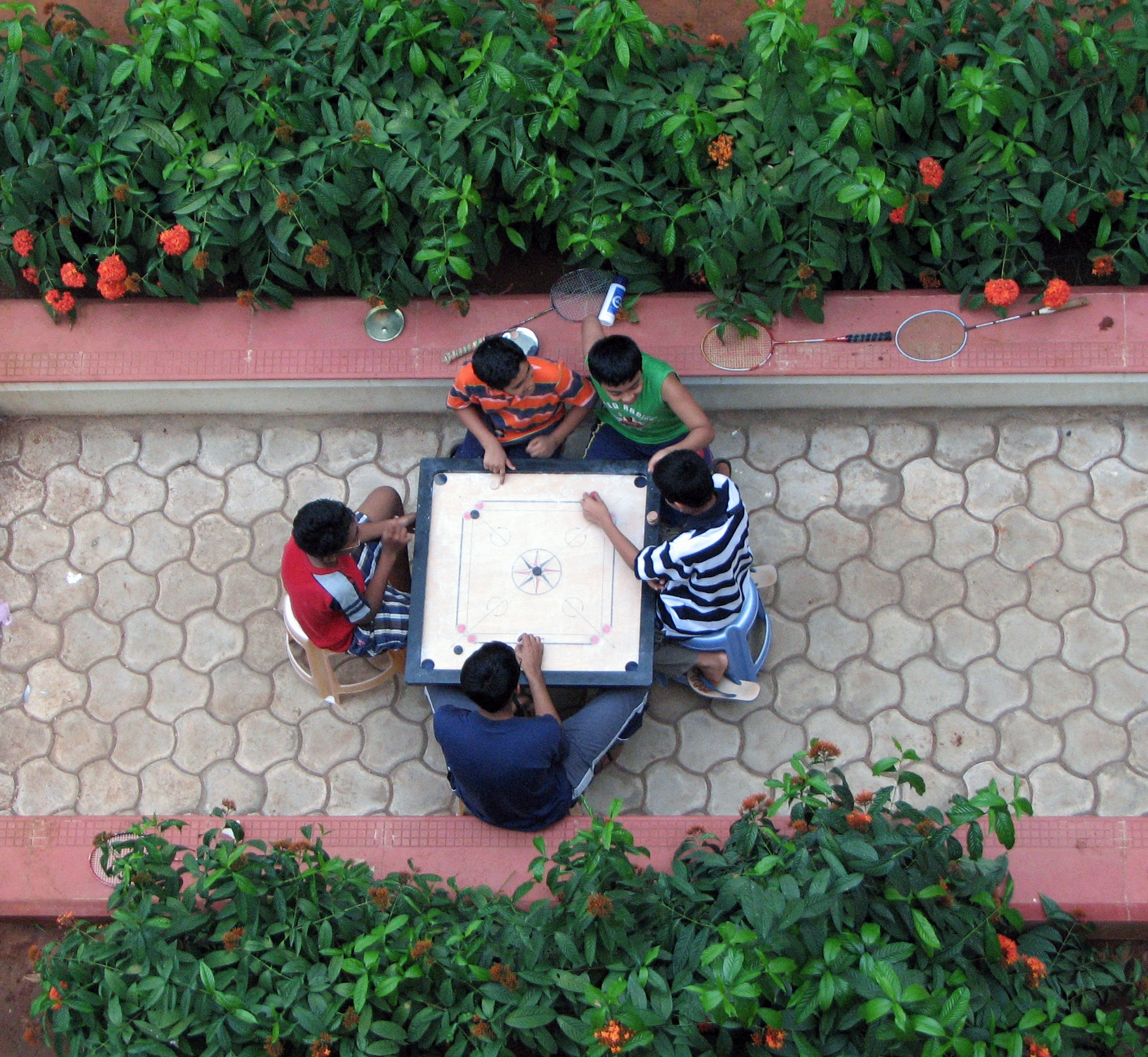
- Children playing carrom in India
- Country: India
- Governing body: All-India Carrom Federation
- National team(s): India

A 'scissors grip' carrom shot.

Carrom is a popular tabletop game in India, enjoyed by people of all ages. Its roots can be traced back to the Indian subcontinent, where it has evolved into a major competitive sport with organized tournaments and federations. Played across households, clubs, and competitions, carrom has grown from being a casual family game to a recognized sport in India and around the world.

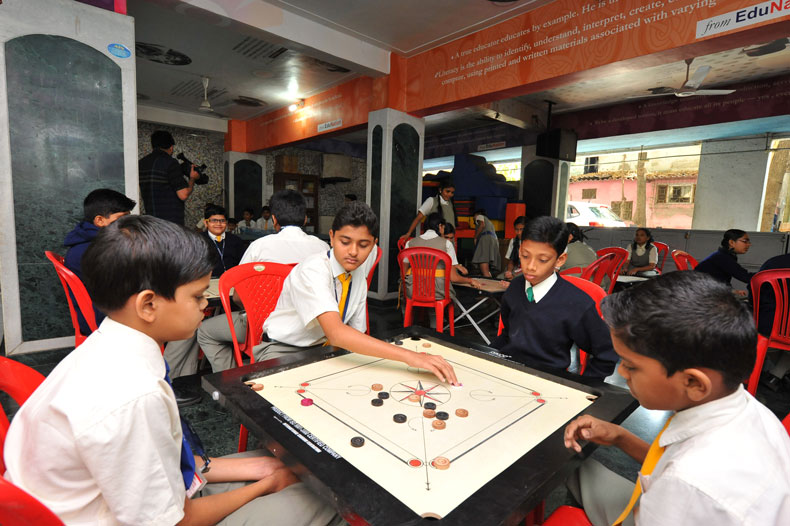
Indian schoolboys playing carrom indoors.

== History ==
The origins of carrom in India are not precisely documented, but it is believed to have been developed in the Indian subcontinent in the late 19th century. One of the earliest references to carrom in India is a glass carrom board found in a palace in Patiala, Punjab. It gained widespread popularity among the middle class during the 20th century. Early evidence suggests that it was inspired by billiards or pool, albeit adapted to Indian cultural contexts, using a flat board instead of pockets.

Carrom became more formalized in the 20th century, and several carrom clubs and organizations were established. The game has spread not only across India but to several parts of South Asia, Southeast Asia, and even the Middle East, largely due to Indian diaspora communities.

== Governing body ==
Carrom in India is administered by the All-India Carrom Federation, which was established in 1956. The AICF is affiliated with the International Carrom Federation, which oversees the global development of the sport.

== Tournaments and competitions ==
Carrom is widely played both casually and professionally in India. The National Carrom Championship is the most prestigious competition organized by the AICF, where top players from across the country compete. In addition, regional tournaments take place at the state level, organized by state carrom associations. India has hosted two World Carrom Championships, in 1991 and 2000, both held in New Delhi.

India has also produced several world champions in carrom, with notable players such as A. Maria Irudayam, K. Srinivas, R. M. Shankra, Ravinder Goud and S. Sudhakar winning international titles. Irudayam, a two-time world champion, is often regarded as one of the best carrom players of all time.

The Indian teams won both the men's and women's teams championships at the sixth Asian carrom champions in the Maldives in April 2023.

== Cultural significance ==
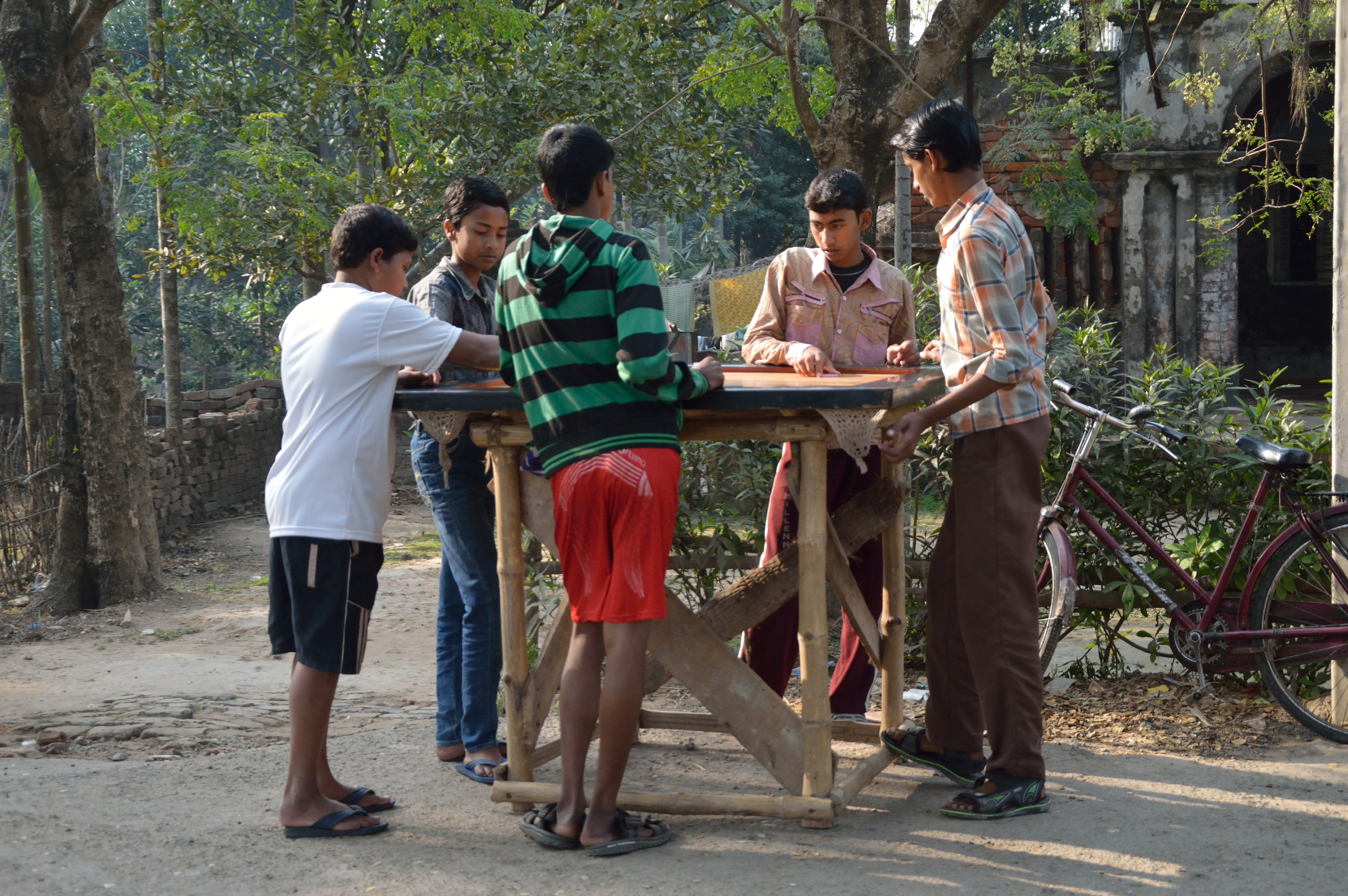
A group of boys playing carrom outdoors in West Bengal.

Carrom is deeply ingrained in Indian culture and is a common pastime in many households. The game is played in both rural and urban settings, often as a recreational activity during family gatherings and festivals. Carrom boards are found in public places such as cafes, schools, and clubs, where people gather to play the game casually.

In some regions of India, carrom tournaments are also organized as part of local festivals, making it an important element of community entertainment.

== In popular culture ==
Films depicting Carrom include the 2003 Hindi film Munna Bhai M.B.B.S, the 2010 Hindi film Striker and the 2018 Tamil film Vada Chennai.

== See also ==
- Category:Indian carrom players
