= Raja Mantri Chor Sipahi =

Indian role-playing game

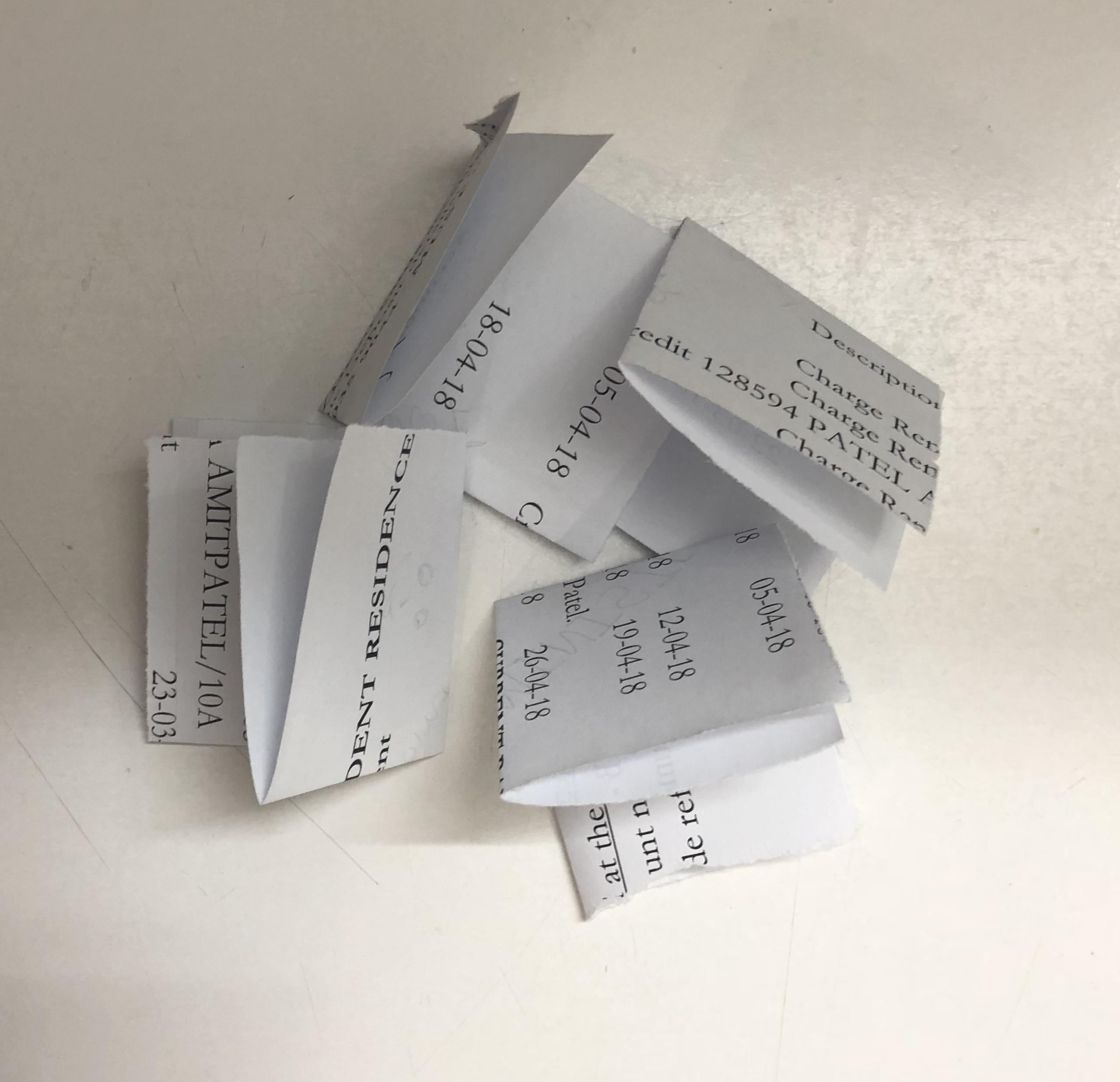
Shuffled chits

Raja Mantri Chor Sipahi (transl. King, Minister, thief and soldier) is a type of role-playing game that is a popular pastime in India. It involves four players—each player takes up the role of either the king, Minister, thief or soldier— and the Soldier (Sipahi) has to guess the identity of the thief. Along with other such games, its popularity has decreased in the 21st century.

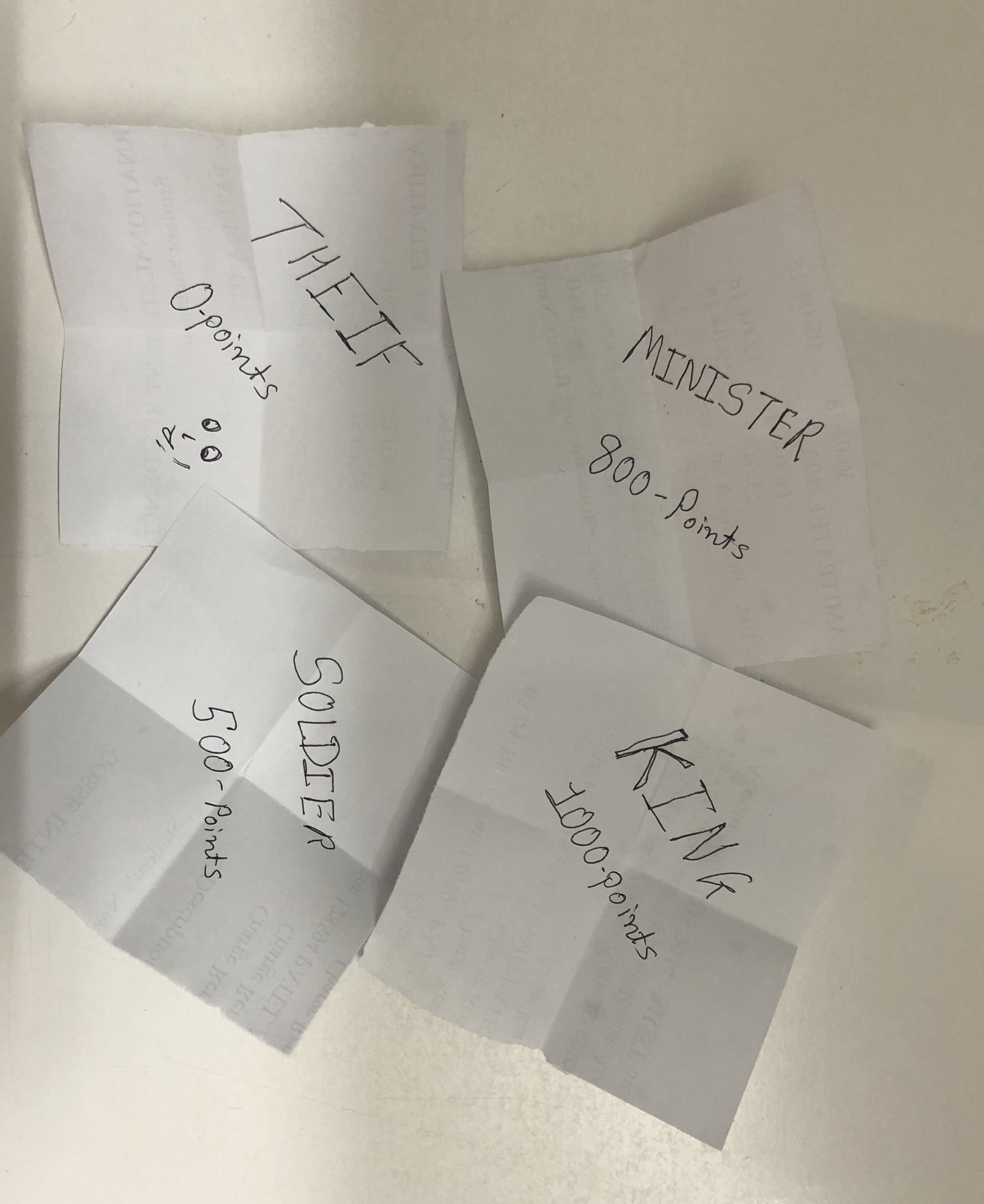
Open chits allocated to each player

== Rules ==
The game begins with making 4 chits namely Raja (1000 points), Mantri (800 points), Chor(0 points) and Sipahi (500 points). Each chit is folded-shuffled and distributed among 4 players with each player picking one chit. Players can open their respective chit to find out their character(which shall not be revealed to anybody). The Sipahi then has to identify the ‘Chor’ from the other 2(Mantri and Chor) players whether they are a “chor” or not. If the Sipahi, guesses correctly then the points are retained or else he/she surrenders them to the Chor. If the Sipahi picks the wrong person then the Chor and Sipahi will have to switch points. Several rounds of this game are played before counting the points. The player with the highest score wins the game.

Variations:

The chits can be King, Soldier, Thief, Minister . The person with the Soldier and Raja chit declares that he is the Soldier/Raja and Soldier has to find the thief from the other 3 players. If more players are to play the game extra chits like Rani “Queen” and “Villager”, are added each with varying points. The King has the highest points followed by the Mantri. Points are awarded to the Soldier or thief based on whether the soldier guesses the identity of the thief correctly.

== Gameplay variations ==
Because the game is a traditional pastime passed down orally through generations, rules and roles vary significantly across different households and regions in India. There are two primary variations of the guessing mechanics:

=== The Soldier Detective variant ===
In this widely popular version, the King directly commands the Soldier to investigate the court. It is often accompanied by the traditional Hindi rhyme, "Sipahi, Sipahi, chor ko pakdo, mantri ko lauta do" (Soldier, soldier, catch the thief and return the minister).

- The player holding the Sipahi (Soldier) chit must reveal themselves and guess who among the remaining two hidden players holds the Chor (Thief) chit.
- If the Soldier guesses correctly, they retain their 500 points. If they guess incorrectly by accusing the Minister, their 500 points are forfeited to the Thief, and the Soldier receives 0 points for that round.

=== The Wise Minister variant ===
In this alternative version, the game focuses on the traditional role of the Minister as the royal court's primary strategist and intellectual.

- The King opens the round by asking, "Mera Mantri Kaun?" (Who is my Minister?).
- The Mantri (Minister) reveals themselves and is tasked by the King to identify the hidden Thief.
- The Soldier remains a passive role in this variant, securing a flat 500 points without needing to guess. If the Minister guesses wrong, their points are traded with or given to the Thief.

=== Regional nomenclature ===
In various parts of South India, the game is adapted using figures from regional folklore or epics, frequently played under titles such as "Ram, Laxman, Seeta, Devi" rather than the standard royal court hierarchy.
