= Nalugu Rallu Aata =

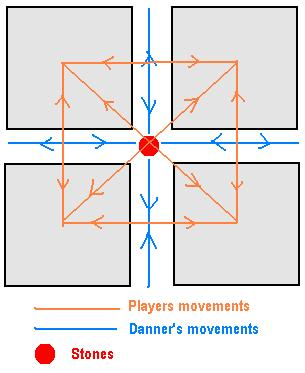
NaluguRalluAata

Nalugu Rallu Aata is a very ancient traditional outdoor four-player game played by the children of the past generation, until the late 1960s and 1980s in many rural districts of Andhra Pradesh State. The origin and the birth of this game is unknown. Today this game has completely vanished due to urbanization and the introduction of western games.

Four independent boxes are drawn on plane ground as shown in the figure. The blue line indicates the path along which the denner moves and the orange lines indicate the path along which the players move. A denner is decided after the chain cut.

== Objective ==
Four players stand in their squares and four stones one above the other are placed at the center. The objective of each player is to have a stone without being captured by the denner. The objective of the denner is to capture the players who move in their way.

== Strategy ==
When the game starts, the denner keeps moving along his path to capture the players who try to pick up the stones. The denner is not supposed to enter into the boxes. One of the players take initiative to pick up all the stones and tries to move into any of the boxes one by one and distributes the stones to the other players. However it is not necessary that only one player should take initiative in picking up all the stones, but every player can pick up any number of stones for distribution. When each player picks up at least one stone by default, there is no need of distribution.

When all the players get their stones, they would ask the denner to choose either "Gumpu" (Group) or "Chuttu" (circling). When the denner chooses Gumpu, and selects a particular box, then all other players carefully gather in the selected box, with the stones in their hands. For the choice of Chuttu, each player will have to make 6 rounds and finally reach their native box. A player, while shifting to other boxes, is declared to be out when he/she is touched by the denner. The game continues as long as one of the players is out.

== See also ==
- Nalugu Stambhalata (game)
