= Seven stones =

South Asian dodgeball variant

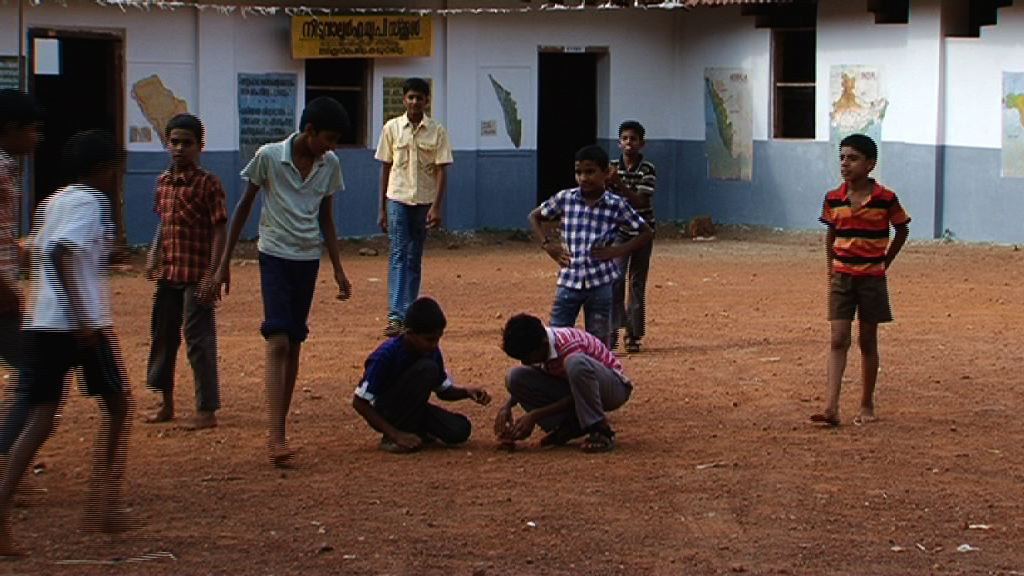
- A game of Dabba Kali in Kerala
- Setup time: less than a minute
- Playing time: 3 minutes
- Chance: Low
- Skills: Running, Observation, Speed, Strength, Throwing and concentration

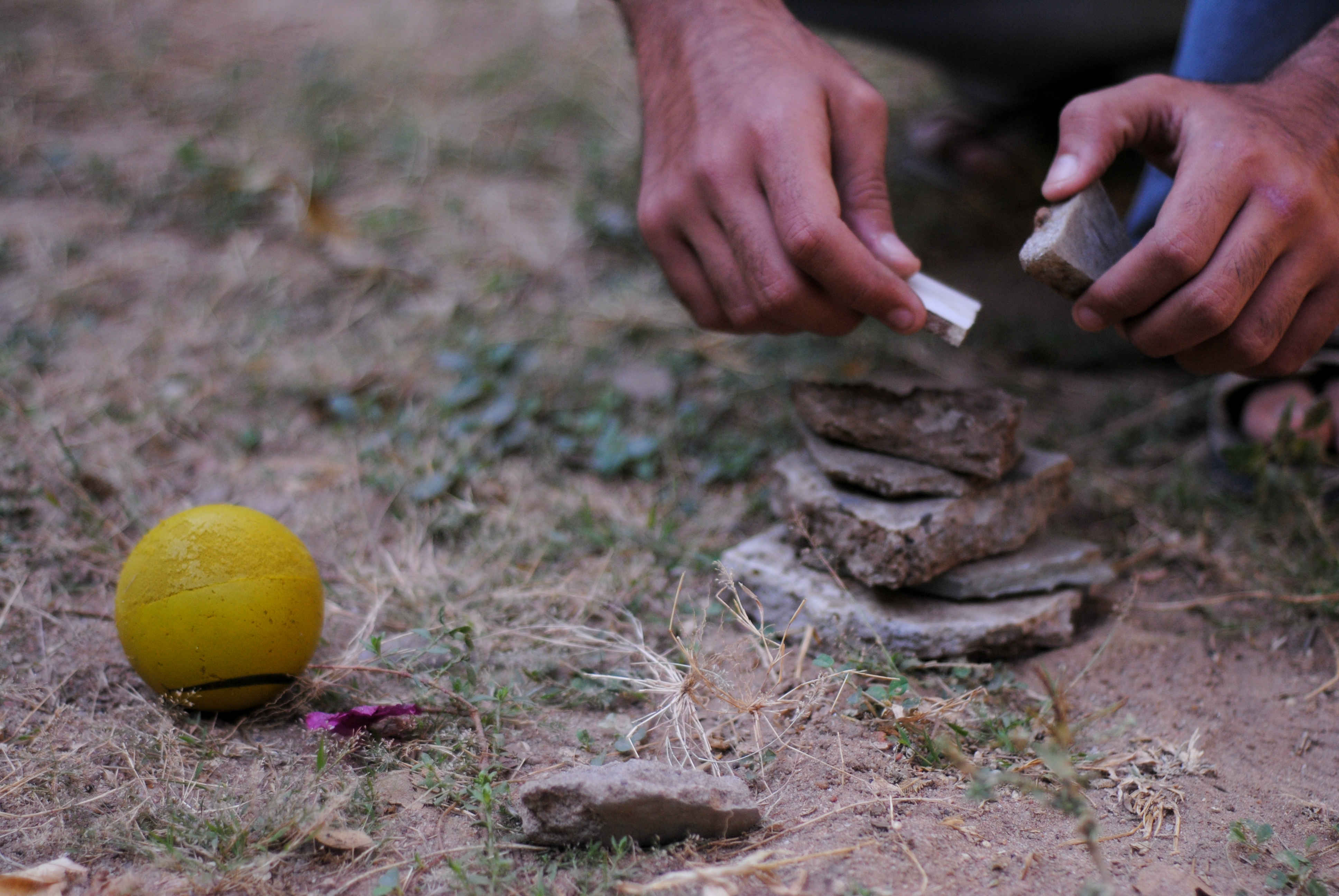
Seven stones game

Kids playing Lagori in a Bangalore street

Seven stones (also known by various other names) is a traditional game from the Indian subcontinent involving a ball and a pile of flat stones, generally played between two teams in a large outdoor area.

== History ==
Seven stones is one of the most ancient games originating from the Indian subcontinent. Its history dates back to the Bhagavata Purana, a Hindu religious text, which mentions Lord Krishna, a major deity in Hinduism, playing the game with his friends.

Through cultural exchange and migration, the game has made its way to various parts of Asia, such as Nepal, Pakistan, Bangladesh, Iran, Afghanistan, and Sri Lanka. The British Empire's colonization process introduced the game to various parts of Africa, the Caribbean, and Southeast Asia. Because the game is now played in over 30 counties, the rules have been adjusted based on where the game is played, however the fundamental rules have remained the same.

== Gameplay ==
Gameplay varies based on geography and cultural adaptations, but the fundamental rules are as follows. A member of the attacking team (the seekers) throws a ball at a pile of seven stones in an attempt to knock them over. If a seeker fails to knock over at least one stone within a certain amount of tries, it becomes another team members turn. The objective of the seekers is to try and restore the pile of stones while staying safe from the defending team's (the hitters’) throws. The hitters' objective is to hit or touch the seekers with the ball before they can reconstruct the stone pile. If the ball touches a seeker, that seeker is out and the team which the seeker came from continues, without the seeker. Points are awarded to the seekers if they are able to restack the stone pile and hitters receive points for eliminating the seekers. The round is completed when the stone pile is reconstructed or the hitters eliminate all of the seekers.

=== Additional rules ===
The rules below are optional variations and not used by all players.

- The throwing seeker cannot come too close to the piled-up stones while attempting to knock them over. They have to do so from behind a line marked on the ground.
- If the person trying to knock down the pile cannot do it in three tries, their turn is over.
- If the thrower's ball does not knock down the pile and is caught by an opponent after one bounce then the thrower is out.
- Each team contains an equal number of players.
- Piles of flat stones contain 7 stones.
- Hitters cannot run with the ball to hit the seekers.
- The seeker, after restoring the pile of stones, says the game's name to announce the reconstruction of the pile of stones.

== Alternative names ==
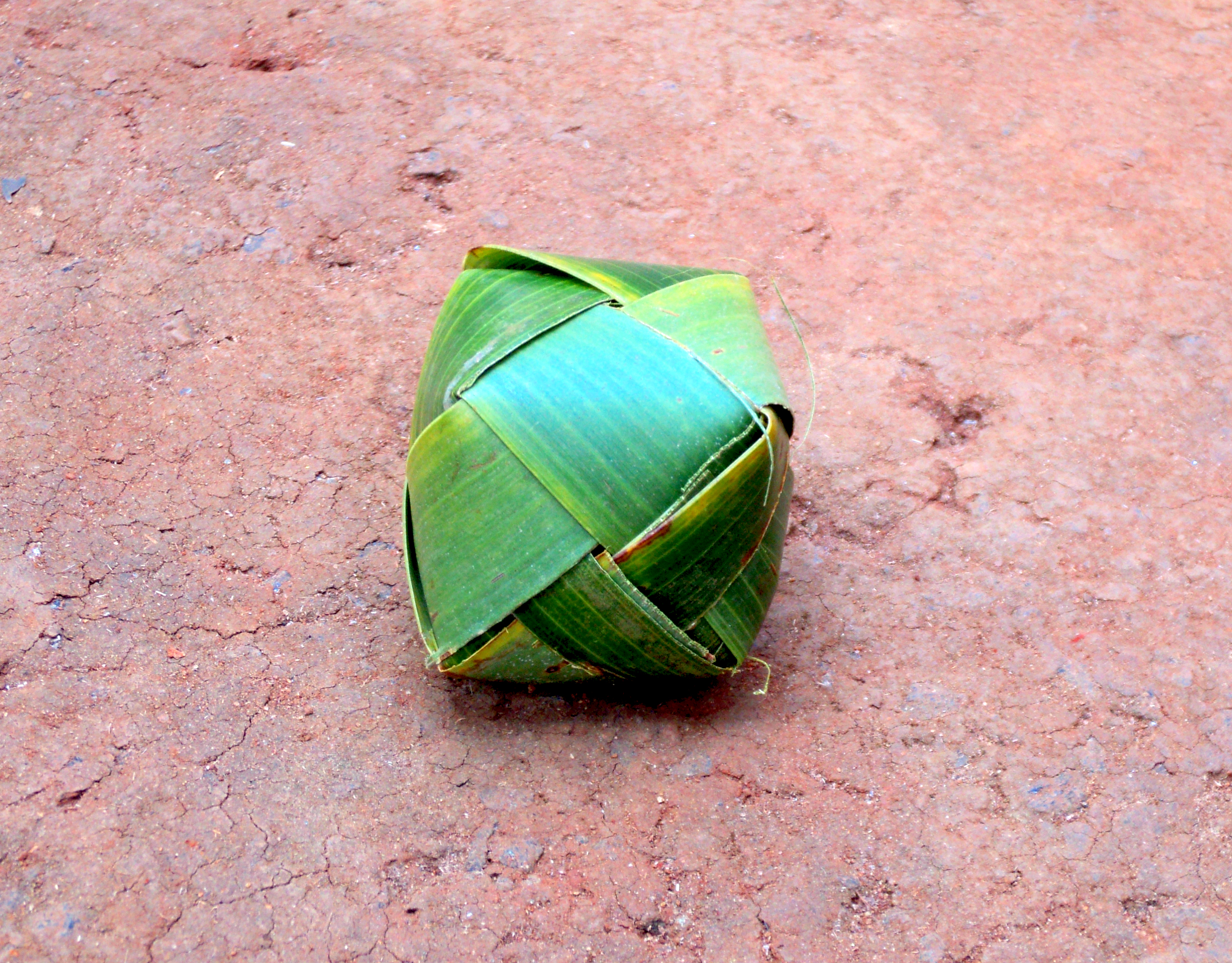
Olapanthu - ball made of coconut leaves - used to play the game in Kerala

In other parts of India, the same game is known by several other names:

- Garam (Punjab)
- Pithu garam (Himachal)
- Lagori (Karnataka)
- Lingoj or Lingot (Telangana)
- Lingorcha, Lagori, Seven Tilo (Maharashtra)
- Pitto, Pithu (Haryana, Uttarakhand, Uttar Pradesh, northern Rajasthan and West Bengal)
- Sitoliya (Rajasthan, Bihar, Madhya Pradesh)
- Satodiyu (Gujarat)
- Bam Pitto, pittu (Bihar)
- Yedu penkulata, Yedu rallu, dikori or pittu (Andhra Pradesh)
- Palli Patti (Karimnagar)
- Seventees / Dabba kali (Kerala, played using a ball made of coconut leaves"olapanthu")
- Ezhu kallu (Tamil Nadu).
- Garmaan, Garam, Minto (Kashmir)
- Sat khapri (Jharkhand)
- Pittu (Odisha)

Similar to India, the game is identified differently in various countries, but the spirit of the sport remains the same.

- Haft Sang (Iran)
- Sat Chara (Bangladesh)
- Seven Stone / Game Ball (Nepal)
- Pitho Garam, Pitthu Garam, Pitthu Gol Garam, Pittu Garam, Pittu Gol Garam (Pakistan)
- Cantracon (Afghanistan)

== Modern day ==
Traditional games such as seven stones are not as popular as they once were, but the game is still played by at least 30 nations across the world. The game has gradually gained a considerable amount of global prominence. However, India is the epicenter of the development of the game on with a bigger platform and a wide outreach to contemporary audience. The Indian Lagori Premier League that was held in November 2017 had gathered great momentum across the nation which was organized by the Amateur Lagori Federation of India. They have also made efforts to push the game to several states of India as well as in other countries, playing a pivotal role in popularizing the game. The second Lagori World Cup (first being played in 2015) is soon going to take place later this year, several nations including Indian, Bhutan Hong Kong, Brazil, Turket, Sri Lanka, Bangladesh, and Nepal will go face to face.

The rules have not changed that much over the years, however there have been some changes brought in the way the game is being played. The following fundamentals were laid down by the International Lagori Foundation: Each team would have 12 players, with only 6 players on the court for every set. One set lasts for 3 minutes followed by a half minute break in between sets. One match has typically 3 sets and the team scoring maximum points wins. Other than that, the rules are basically the same for all leagues. Having said that, the game has definitely come a long way from what it was. From a dusty open field to an indoor synthetic turf, from a pile of stones lying around in the field to 7 circular fibre discs made for the game, and from an old tennis ball to a softball specifically tailored for the game.

Despite the game almost being forgotten and becoming extinct in the past few decades, the inaugural World Cup help in 2015 was a huge success paired with the Indian Lagori Premiere League (ILPL) catering to a wide audience in the country.

== In popular media ==
- In the grand season finale of TVF Triplings, a popular Indian mini internet series made by TVF (The Viral Fever), a game of SPL (Sitoliya Pitto Lagori) acts as the glue that brings together a group of estranged siblings.
