= K. Srinivas (carrom player) =

K. Srinivas (born 28 October 1993) was the Indian national carrom champion and the winner of the 4th Carrom World Cup held at the Maldives. He won numerous title in men's single and double tournaments held around the globe. He was felicitated by women's national carrom champion P. Nirmala, and congratulated for winning the men's singles national championship.
