= Nalugu Stambhalata (game) =

Traditional Indian children's game

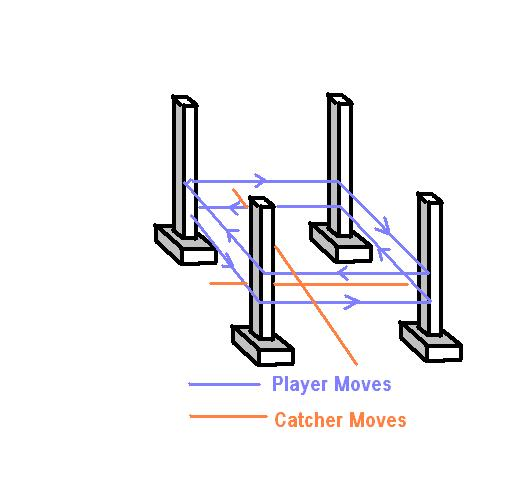
Nalugu Stambhalata

Nalugu Stambhalata (Telugu: నాలుగు స్తంభాలాట; English Translation: A game of four pillars) is a traditional Indian children's game popular in the 1960s and 1970s, when the joint family system flourished in Andhra Pradesh, India.

Children used to play this game in Manduva Logili houses, which are constructed with several wooden pillars (made of Rosewood or Teak) and an open space at the center. The game was also played outdoor in open woods. The game eventually diminished in popularity due to the decline of joint families and the increase of urbanization, western influence, and English education.

== Rules ==
The game is played within a square area, with a pillar in each corner. One player stands at each pillar, with the four pillar-players constantly attempting to switch pillars. A fifth player attempts to tag the other players while they are moving between the pillars.

== Popular culture ==
In 1982, the Tollywood movie Nalugu Stambhalata has used the name as title.

== See also ==
- Nalugu Rallu Aata
- Four corners (game)
