= Festival Permainan Malaysia =

Festival for traditional Malaysian games

Festival Permainan Malaysia (Malaysian Games Festival) is an annual Malaysian event for games. Traditional Malaysian games feature prominently in the event.

The event is also designed to provide opportunities to generate income for arts and culture entrepreneurs in order to promote local economic growth.

== Games ==
- Galah panjang
- Kabaddi
- Rampanau (racing on bamboo stilts)
- Congkak
- Dam aji (variation of checkers)
- Kelereng (marbles game)
