= Traditional games of Singapore =

Singapore has several traditional games that trace their origins to the nation's diverse ethnic groups.

== Games ==
=== Capteh ===
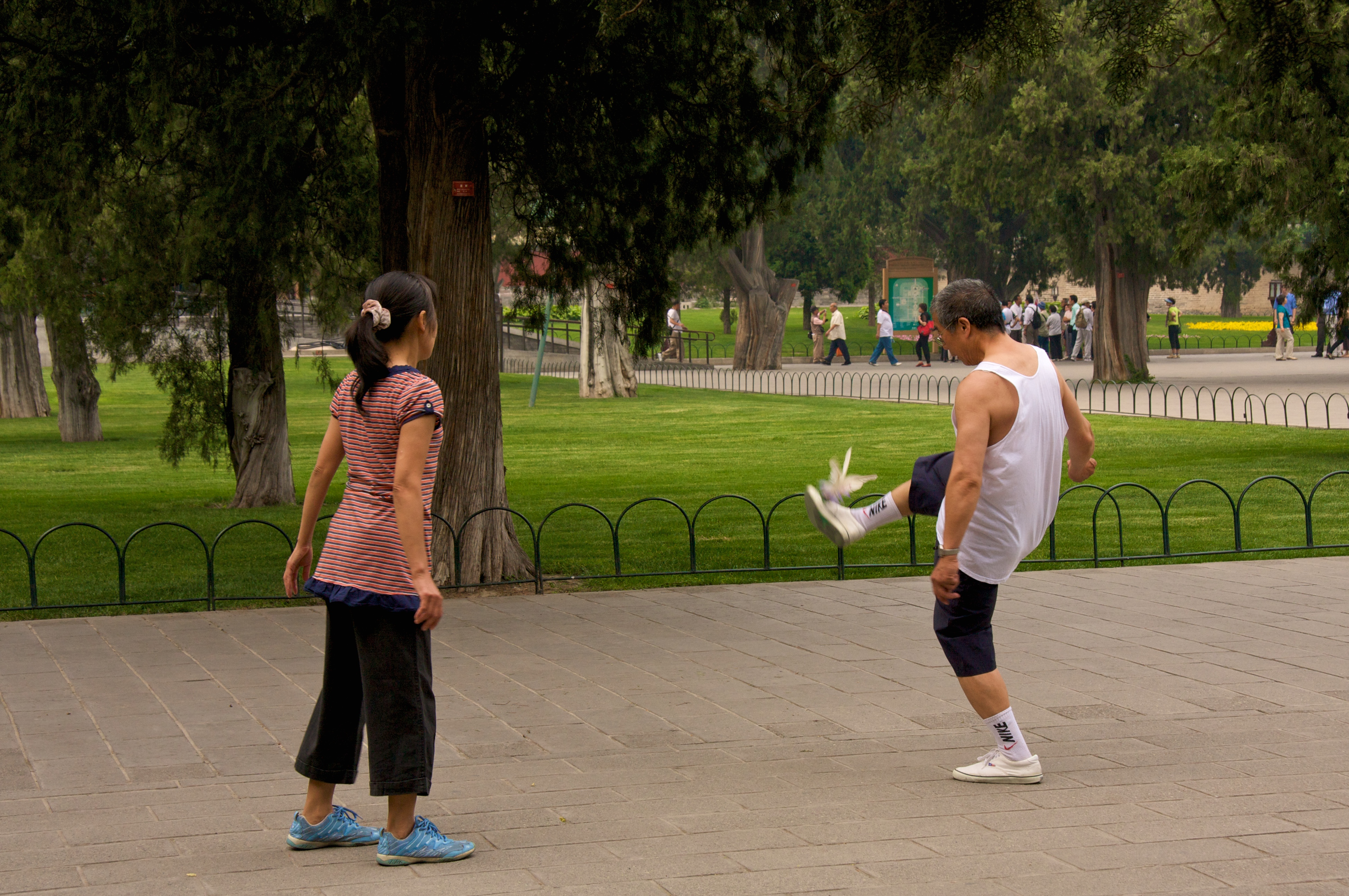
Two people playing jianzi

Jianzi (Chinese: 毽子; pinyin: jiànzi), is a traditional Chinese sport in which players aim to keep a heavily weighted shuttlecock in the air using their bodies apart from the hands, unlike in similar games such as peteca and indiaca. The primary origin of jianzi is an ancient Chinese game called cuju, from the Han dynasty (202 BC – 9 AD, 25–220 AD). Jianzi is played on a badminton court using inner or outer lines in different competition settings. It can also be played artistically, among a circle of players in a street or park, with the objective to keep the shuttle 'up' and show off skills. In Vietnam, it is known as đá cầu, and it is the national sport. In the Philippines, it is known as sipa and was also the national sport, until it was replaced by arnis in December 2009.

The game has also gained a following around the globe. In English, both the sport and the object with which it is played are referred to as a "shuttlecock" or "featherball". In Malaysia, the game is known as capteh, or chapteh. It is considered a game played by children until they can master sepak raga.

=== Encang kuda ===
Also known as keleret, encang kuda (horseback in Malay) is played by two players who take on the roles of “jockey” and “horse”. At the start of the game, both “jockey” and “horse” throw their stones at a straight line on the ground. The one whose stone is nearer to the line gets to ride the back of the other player. The “horse” then picks up two stones and hands them to the “jockey”, who has to throw one stone and then let the “horse” throw the second. If the “horse” accepts the challenge and hits the jockey's stone, he would win; but if the “horse” rejected the challenge, the “jockey” would have to hit the stone himself, and if he succeeded, the “horse” would need to continue supporting him. The game restarts once the jockey misses.

=== Gasing ===
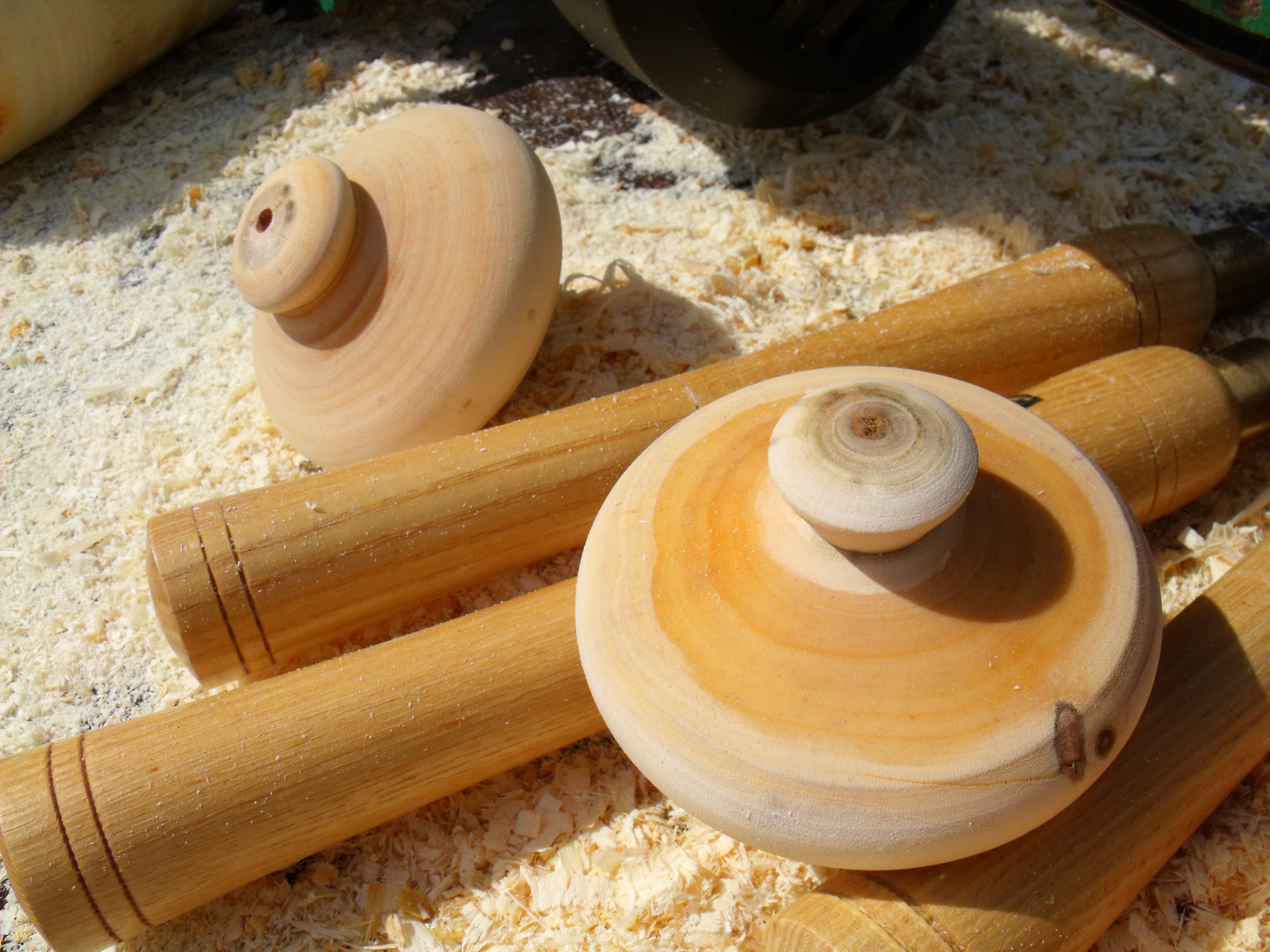
Two unfinished Gasing.

Gasing pangkah is a competitive Malay game of spinning tops in which two or more players compete to strike each other's top out of a circle or to make it fall over and stop spinning.

Considered part of the Malay state heritage, official tournaments are held, with a declared goal of exposing the younger generation to the game.

The game is also popular in neighboring Brunei, and in 2013, a gasing pangkah tournament was held as part of the celebrations of the 67th birthday of the Sultan of Brunei.

=== Goli ===
Goli involved playing with marbles, such as by flicking a marble to dislodge opponents' marbles from a small circle in the middle of the playing area.

== Variations of tag ==
=== Galah panjang ===
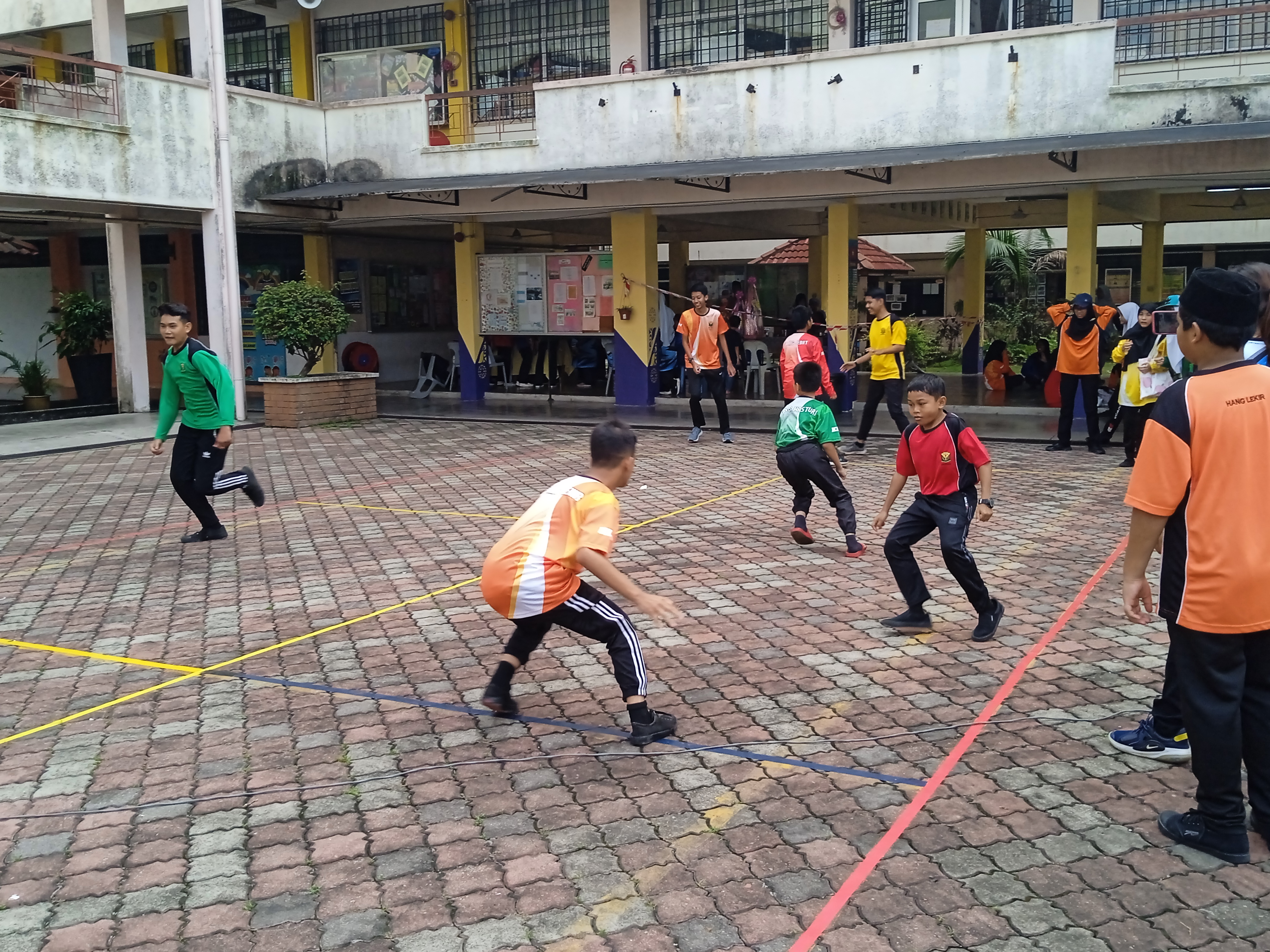
School children playing galah panjang.

Galah panjang is a traditional Malaysian tag game which is played on a long, narrow field. The attacking team's goal is to cross the field and then return to the starting line to win, while the defending team's players attempt to tag the attackers to eliminate them.
