= 2014 Junior Atya Patya National Championship (India) =

Tournament information
- Sport: Atya-patya
- Location: Jammu, India
- Dates: 3 August 2014–5 August 2014
- Venue(s): G.G.M. Science College

The 2014 Junior Atya Patya National Championship was the 27th edition of India's national Atya Patya tournament. It was won by Maharashtra in both the boy's and girl's editions.

== Results ==
=== Boys' edition ===
1st place: Maharashtra

2nd place: Karnataka

3rd place: Puducherry

4th place: Tamil Nadu

=== Girls' edition ===
1st place: Maharashtra

2nd place: Puducherry

3rd place: Karnataka

4th place: Uttar Pradesh
