= 2008 Junior National Atya Patya Championship (India) =

Tournament information
- Sport: Atya-patya
- Location: Chandigarh, India
- Dates: 1 Jun 2008–3 Jun 2008
- Venue(s): St Joseph's School Complex

The 2008 Junior National Atya Patya Championship was the 21st edition of the tournament. Puducherry won both the boy's and girl's editions.

== Results ==
=== Boys' edition ===
1st place: Puducherry

2nd place: Manipur

3rd place: Karnataka

4th place: Maharashtra

=== Girls' edition ===
1st place: Puducherry

2nd place: Karnataka

3rd place: Maharashtra

4th place: Manipur
