= Surr =

Sport played in northern India

Surr playing field

Surr (Note: Other names for Surr (Hindi: सुर्र) include Banvasurr (बणवासुर्र) or Banasur (बाणासुर)) is a tag sport that was once popular among children in villages of Awadh region in northern India.

The game is played on a rectangular field, divided into four equal quadrants, by two teams of two to four players each. The attacking team gathers in one quadrant, and the defending team gathers along the quadrant's borders with the adjoining quadrants. The objective of the attacking team is to enter the other quadrants without being touched by the players of the defending team. If all the members of the attacking team manage to enter all the quadrants, the attacking team wins, and its members shout "Bol Den Goivan Surr!". In an Awadhi variation, they sing "Bol Goiyan Banva Surr" ("बोल गोइयां बणवा सुर्र"); if they are touched by the defending team, they lose, and have to stand on the quadrant line as "thieves", and have to sing another phrase.

The game has declined in popularity, and is now almost extinct.

== See also ==
- Traditional games of India
