= Ostracinda =

Ancient Greek boy game

Ostracinda or Ostrakinda (Ancient Greek: ὀστρακίνδα) was an ancient Greek game for boys, similar to modern Tag (game).

Two sides stand opposite divided by a line drawn on the ground. A boy throws up a shell or a dish, white on one side, and colored black (with pitch) on the other. As he throws the shell, he calls νὺξ (night), or ἡμέρα (day). If the shell falls white side up, the competitor who represents the day pursues, and the competitor who represents the night runs away; if the shell falls black side up, the roles are reversed. As soon as someone is caught he is called ὄνος and is out of the game.

It is not precisely stated whether the game went on until all the fugitives were caught nor whether there was a point of safety to be reckoned, but it is very likely that the game was played with varying rules at different times and places.
