= Atya patya =

Traditional Indian tag sport

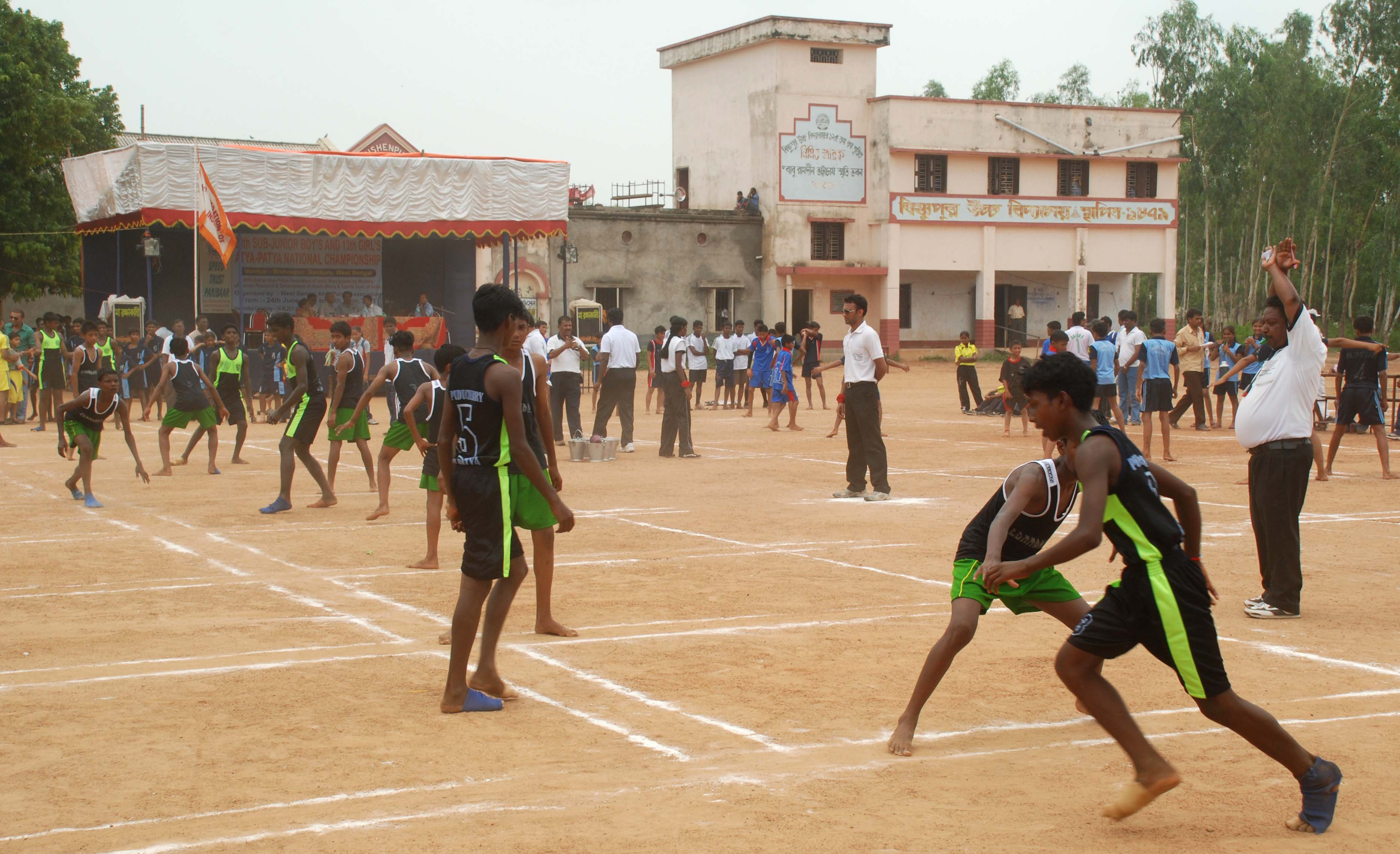
- Nicknames: Atya-patya
- First played: India

Characteristics
- Contact: Limited
- Equipment: None

Presence
- Country or region: South Asia

External videos
- Maharashtra – 27th Senior National Championship, August 2012,, Tamil Nadu semi-final match in YouTube video
- Senior National Atya Patya Championship, Hyderabad 2012, final: Puducherry v/s Maharashtra, YouTube video

Atya patya (Marathi: आट्यापाट्या) is a traditional South Asian tag sport played by two sides of nine players. It is more popular in rural areas of India. It is more commonly played in Maharashtra, a western Indian state. Atya patya is described as a "game of feints". The playing area comprises nine trenches, coming out of either side of a central trench; a point is awarded to the attacking team's players for each trench they cross without being tagged by the defensive players within the trenches. The game ends after 4 innings (scoring turns) of 7 minutes each, with each team having two innings to score. It has been described as a game of "militant chase". The sport is played in a relatively small area and requires no equipment, similar to other games indigenous to India such as kabaddi, seven stones, kho kho, gillidanda and langdi.

The national governed body of the sport is the "Atya Patya Federation of India", formed in 1982. The ministry of Youth Affairs and Sports, government of India, listed the federation amongst its list of recognised federation for the year 2013. The federation is headquartered in Nagpur. Its president is H. B. Hallad.

The first south Asian Atya patya Championship was held in Bhutan in June, 2013. It was won by India.

== Names and variations ==
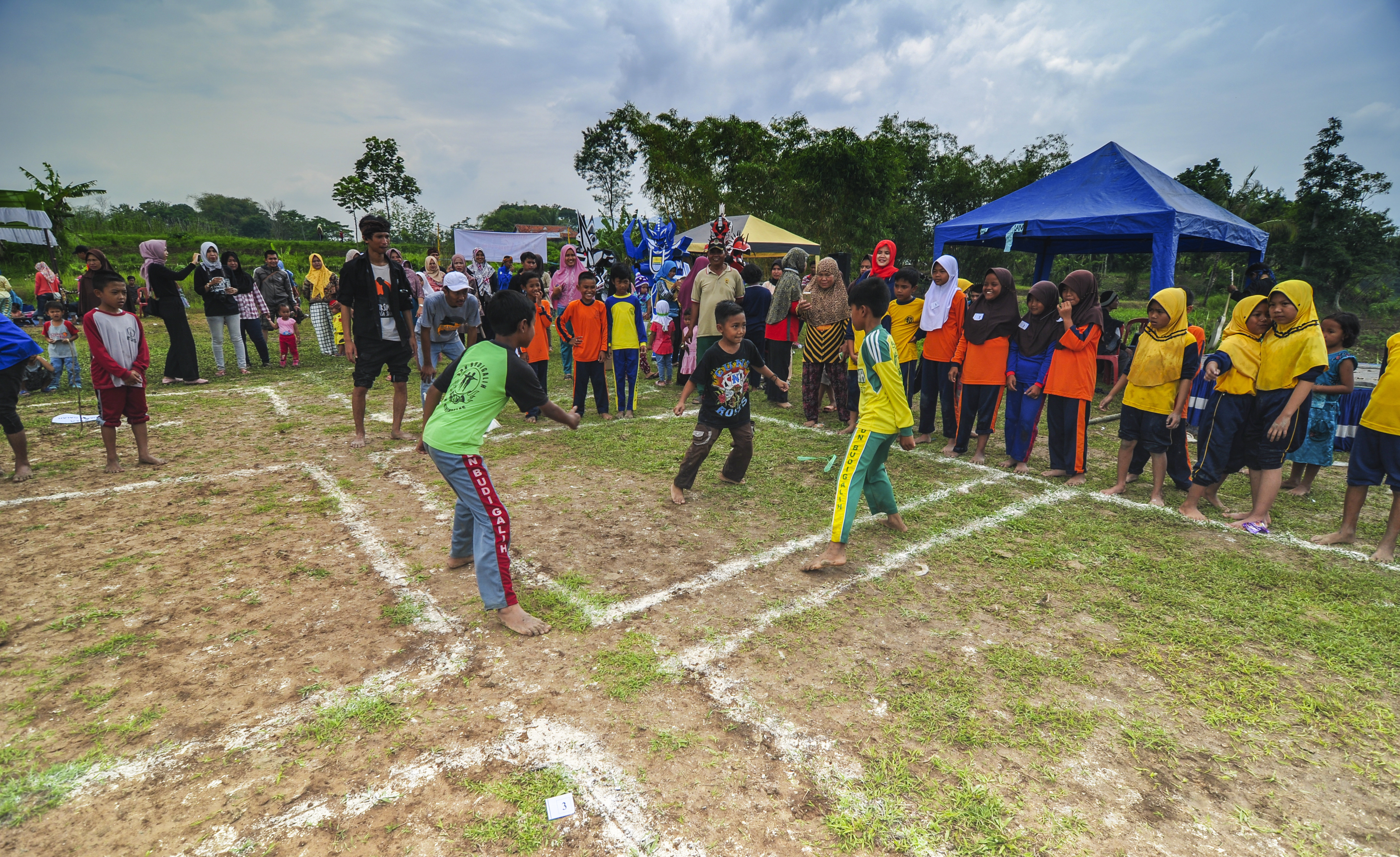
The Indonesian variant gobak sodor, with two defenders (one in the central lane) blocking an assailant.

Some of the alternative names for atya-patya are Killithattu/Klithatu (in Tamil Nadu), Kili Thadthu (in Sri Lanka), Wanjh Wati (in Sindh), Gallery, Sur-pati, Lon-pati, Darya-banth, saragari, saramani, tilli, uppinat, uppupatti, choupal pati, panchwati, and chikka. A related Bengali game is Dari Bandha/Dariabandha, in which the attacking team is considered to be "stealing salt" by making it up the court and then "taking the salt back" to the start of the court.

In Southeast Asia, similar games can be found, such as Galah Panjang/Toi/Tui/Belon Acah in Malaysia, Gobak Sodor/Galah Asin in Indonesia, Htote See Toe in Myanmar, and Patintero in the Philippines. Due to the history of Dutch colonialism in the region, the game was also played by Dutch children.

== History ==
Atya-patya was mentioned in the Natṟiṇai, which was written before 300 AD. It was used as combat practice by soldiers in the Chola dynasty.

== Rules ==
=== Field ===
The playing field is a rectangular court, with a central lane or "trench" 89 feet and 1 inch (27.15 m) long marked lengthwise down the middle of the court. Nine additional trenches, each 23 feet and 1 inch (7.03 m) long, are drawn on the court perpendicular to the central trench and 11 feet (3.4 m) away from each other, from one end of the court to the other.

=== Gameplay ===
The game is played in four innings (turns), with each inning lasting for seven minutes, and the teams alternating attacking and defending roles in each inning. Before each inning, the defensive team places one player in each of the trenches. A batch of four players on the attacking team, who are referred to as "assailants", line up at one end of the court, in the area in front of the front trench. The goal of the assailants is to score by crossing each trench without being eliminated; the total number of points scored in an inning by the attacking team is equal to the number of trenches crossed by their furthest-advancing assailant. If an assailant is touched by a defender (and the defender commits no faults, such as stepping out of their trench, or lifting a foot at or immediately after the time of tagging the assailant), then the assailant is "out", and must leave the court. The assailant is also out if they step out of the field while failing to keep any part of their body grounded within the field.

If an assailant crosses all nine trenches, they may say the word "Tond", which compels the defenders to turn around, allowing the assailant to now attempt to re-cross the nine trenches in the opposite direction. If an assailant manages to cross all nine trenches in both directions, a "Lona" is said to have been scored, meaning that 18 points have been scored by the attacking team for the 18 times that assailant crossed a trench; after a Lona has been scored, the not-out assailants are brought back to the starting area and then allowed to continue scoring for the remainder of the inning.

Atya-patya matches are decided on a best-of-three basis.

==== List of defensive faults ====
A defender's tag of an assailant does not count if the defender commits any of the following actions during or immediately after the tag:

- Raising a foot in the air.
- Placing any part of the body other than the feet onto the ground (known as a "hand fault").
- Placing a foot even partially outside of their trench (known as a "foot fault").
- Turning around (this occurs when the defender's shoulders face more than 90 degrees away from the front of their trench, and is known as "turning face").

==== Grenadier or sur ====
The defender in the front trench is known as a "grenadier" or "sur", and is able to run in either the front trench or the central trench. Grenadiers are allowed to commit any fault other than a foot fault or hand fault where part of their body goes outside of their trench.

At the start of the inning, or after a Lona has been scored, the grenadier must "cut the squares" before tagging any assailants, meaning that the grenadier must run from the square which is formed by the intersection of the front trench and the central trench to the square formed by the intersection of the next trench and the central trench, and then back to the first square.

==== Rings ====
Special rules apply when two or more assailants are encircled by a regular defender and a grenadier, which is known as a "ring".

== 2013 National Championship ==
The national level Atya Patya tournament for 2013 was held at Bhatkal in Karnataka. Represented by 22 states & Union Territories, the event was organized jointly by Karnataka Atya Patya association Davangere and Bhatkal Atya Patya association.

== Controversy ==
The president of Puducherry Atya patya Association, Selvan refuted accusations levelled by Anbhagan, Member of Legislative Assembly, Puducherry, that Atya patya certificates were issued to take benefit of quota available to sports persons, in seats at medical colleges. He stated that the sport was registered in 22 states of India including in Tamil Nadu. The Orissa High Court, in 1997 observed that; "The clear and categorical case of the petitioner is that she having represented the Orissa State team is the VIth National (Senior) Atya Patya Championship held in New Delhi from 22nd to 24th July, 1994 which is a recognised national event is entitled to be admitted in the 1st year Diploma in Engineering under Sports quota." giving relief to a petitioner who was denied admission under sports quota.

== See also ==
- Surr
- Kho kho
- British bulldog (game)
