= Traditional games in Indonesia =

Traditional games in Indonesia are games that are commonly played by Indonesian children and have roots / acculturated to the Indonesian native culture. Indonesian parents often use traditional games to educate their children about character building. As a result, nearly all children in the era before the 1990s played traditional games.

== Without tools ==
=== Elephant ant man ===
This game is played by 2 (two) or more people. It is similar with Rock-paper-scissors from China-Japan. This game is also known as suit, and are often used to determine roles or turns at the beginning of the games.

1. The player hide their right hands behind their heads.
2. They count out aloud One..Two..Three..Go!
3. On the word "go!", their hands come out in three ways; the thumb, index finger, or little finger is pointed toward the opposite player.

- The pointed thumb is the elephant.
- The pointed index finger is the man.
- The pointed little finger is the ant.

The rules to decide who is the winner:

- Elephant wins over man because he can trample him.
- Man wins over ant because he can step on him.
- Ant wins over elephant because he can run up his trunk and tickle him to death.

=== Hom pim pa ===
Another variation of Rock-paper-scissors with much simpler rules. Played with three or more players using their palm and back of the hand.

- All players sing together the song "Hompimpa alaium gambreng. Mpok Ipah pakai baju rombeng."
- When the song is finished, all players' hands come out and show their hand side.
- The different one is the winner (i.e. if one player faces their hand the opposite way of the other players, that player wins.)

Hom-Pim-Pa used to start several traditional games that rely on team decision-making.

=== Petak umpet ===
Petak umpet is Indonesian for hide and seek. Petak Umpet can be played by many players. Starting with Hom pim pah for deciding the cat or the seeker among more than two players. The cat closes their eyes, faces the wall or tree as inglo (basecamp) for a while, and counts to the numbers that they agreed on (usually the number that they chose is multiples of ten) before the cat starts looking for the other players. If the other players who are hiding touch the base, the game will be repeated with the same cat. The game ends when all the players, who are hiding, are found and the first discovered is the next cat.

== Variations of tag ==
=== Bentengan ===
Similar to capture the flag, this game features two teams split into two halves of the field and looking to invade the other team's territory. Each team has a pole in its half, and the goal of the game is to touch the pole in the other team's half without being tagged, because being tagged turns one into a prisoner of the other team.

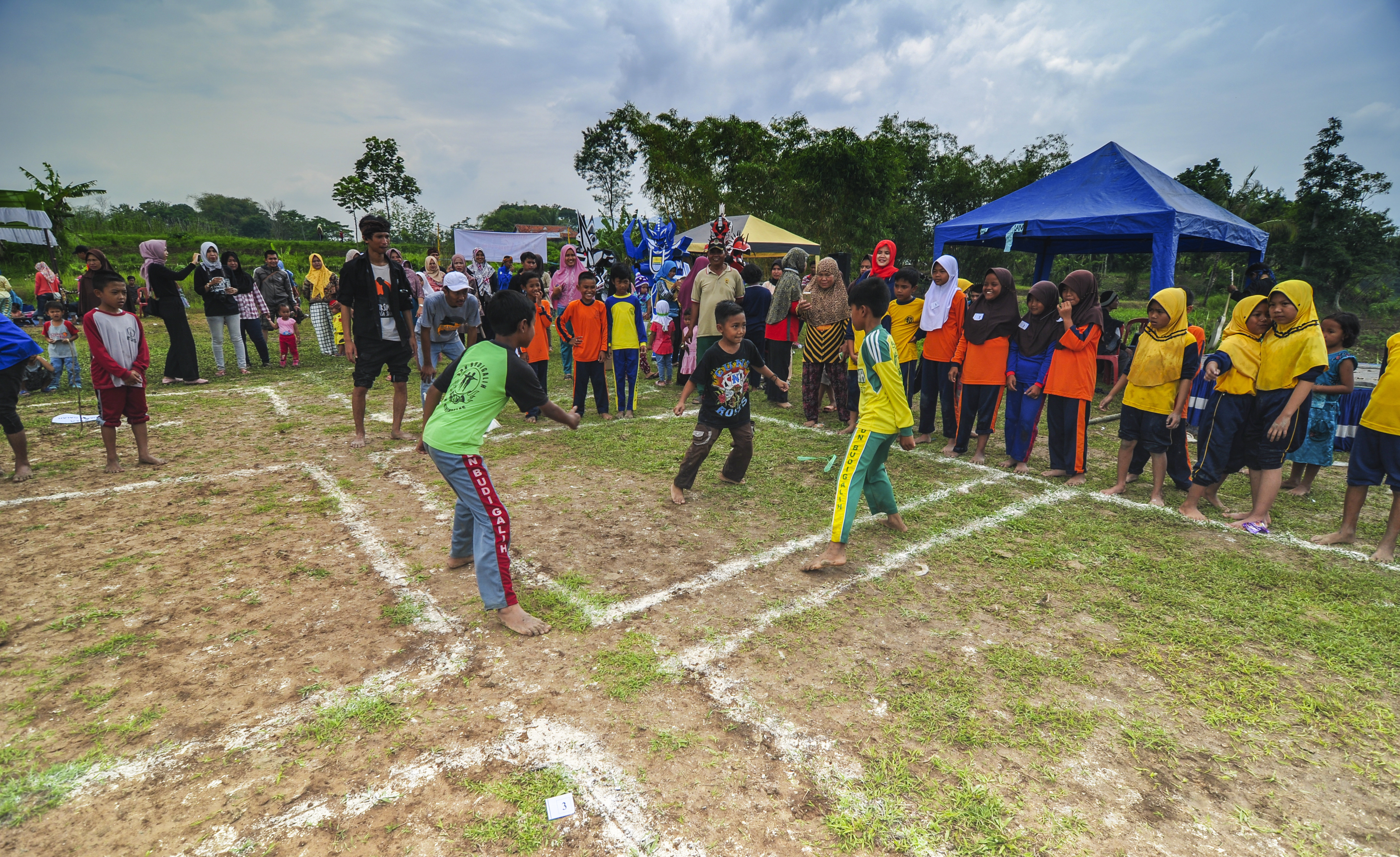
Two defenders (one in the central lane which cuts across the field vertically) attempt to stop an offensive player from passing them.

=== Gobak sodor ===
Also known as Galah Asin, this game involves players on the offensive team trying to cross the lines of a narrow field without being tagged by opponents standing on those lines.

=== Kucing-kucingan ===
Kucing-kucingan, also known as cat and mouse (playground game) is a type of game that is widely played in Indonesia. This game does not require any tools, it only requires a group of people to play this game. According to the ancient records of Serat Karya Saraja, this game is estimated to have existed since 1913 in Java. In ancient times, many children played running around like cats chasing mouse, and this is where the origin of this game was named kucing-kucingan. Kucing is indonesian for cat. This game does not require a large area of land, but enough space to play in groups.

How to play:

- The players stand in a large circle depending on the number of players and hold hands.
- Decide who will be the cat and mouse.
- The player who is in charge of being a cat is tasked with chasing and catching players who became a mouse. Players who form a circle are tasked with protecting the mouse. When the mouse comes into the circle, the players who form this circle will sit and act like a lock, so the cat doesn't come.
- Players who become cat and mouse can alternate between the players. This is done so that the players can feel the role and not get tired.

== With tools ==
=== Congklak ===
Congklak is a traditional game known by various names on the Indonesian archipelago. The most common name, congklak, is taken from cowrie shell, which is commonly used to Playing Congklak. In Java, the games is known as congklak, dakon, dhakon, or dhakonan. In Lampung, the game is called dentuman lamban. In Sulawesi, Mokaotan, Maggaleceng, Aggalacang and Nogarata.
