= Cat and mouse (playground game) =

Children's game

Cat and mouse is a gymnasium or playground game. Children form a circle with their hands, and two players are chosen to be the Cat and the Mouse. The Cat is trying to catch the Mouse, while the Mouse is trying to not be caught. There are many further variations.

== Variations ==
- The Mouse stands in the circle. The Cat is outside the circle and must get in.
- The Mouse starts inside the circle and the Cat starts outside. The Mouse must move continuously while in the circle, and stay for no longer than 10 seconds. The Cat may not go into the circle, but they may reach with their arms. Circle players attempt to block the Cat from catching the Mouse by letting the Mouse in and out by lifting and lowering their arms. The Mouse becomes the next Cat if caught, with the Cat joining the circle, and a new Mouse is chosen.
- Circle players form the widest circle they can, fully extending their arms. The Cat and Mouse start on opposite sides of the outside of the circle. If one of the spaces formed by arms is passed through by the Cat or the Mouse, the players close that space. The game proceeds until all spaces are closed. If one player is trapped in the circle, the other player wins. If both players are unable to pass through (being on the inside or the outside together) the circle players will count to ten. If the Cat catches the Mouse in that time, then the Cat wins, but if not, the Mouse wins.
- The UK Scout Association refers to a version of the game played using a parachute.
