= Galah panjang =

Traditional Malaysian tag game

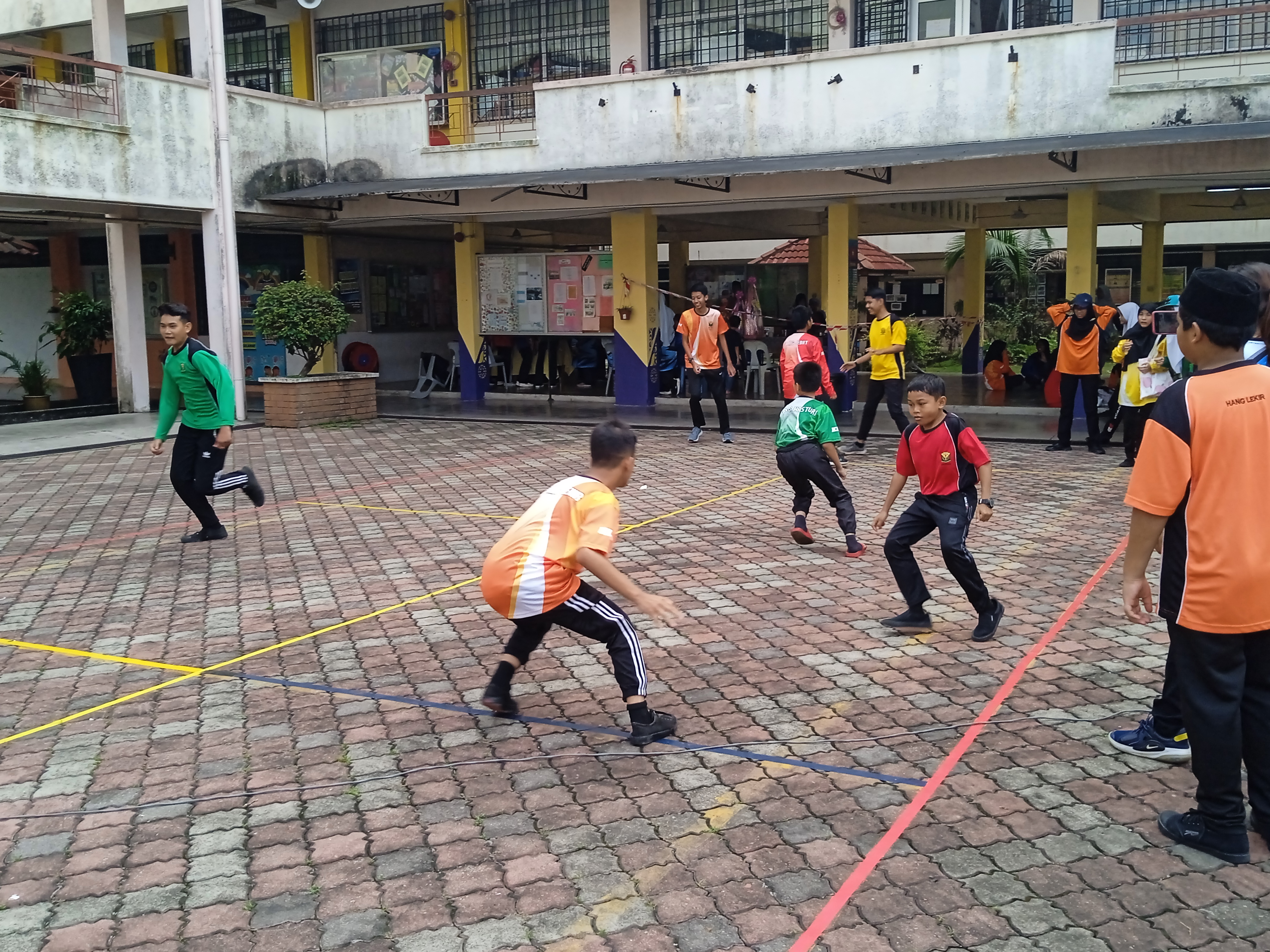
School children playing galah panjang.

Galah panjang is a traditional Malaysian tag game which is played on a long, narrow field. The attacking team's goal is to cross the field and then return to the starting line to win, while the defending team's players attempt to tag the attackers to eliminate them.

== History ==
"Galah panjang" means long pole, which refers to the central line that stretches down the court length-wise.

Galah panjang is very similar to the traditional Indian game atya-patya, which was played since at least 300 CE.

== Rules ==
=== Field ===
The grid lines of a badminton court can be used to play galah panjang.

There is one central line which goes down the middle of the court length-wise, and several other lines which run perpendicular to the central line; the total number of lines equals the number of players on the defensive team.

=== Gameplay ===
Each team generally has at least four players. The defending team stations one of its players on each of the lines before play starts, with the defenders required to remain on their designated lines throughout the game.

If an attacker steps out of the field, they are out (eliminated).

== Variations ==
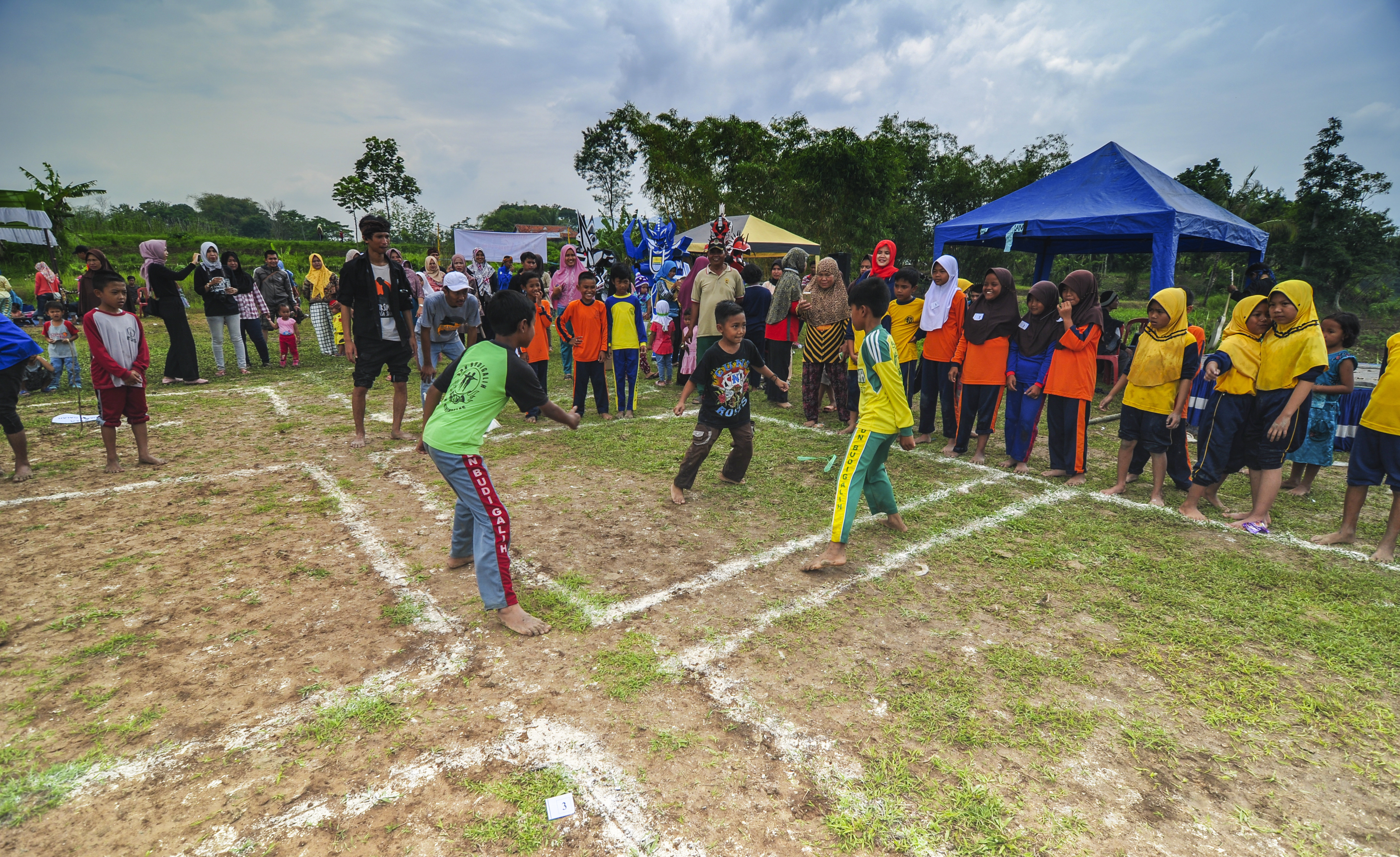
The Indonesian variant gobak sodor.

Galah panjang is also played in Singapore. It is known by different names in different parts of Southeast Asia, such as gobak sodor in Indonesia, patintero in the Philippines, and galah asin in West Java.

Due to the history of Dutch colonialism in the region, the game was also played by Dutch children.
