= Tag (game) =

Game of chasing and catching other people

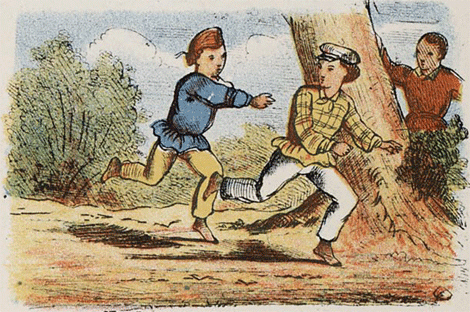
- A Dutch cartoon of children playing tag, 1860s
- Players: 2 or more
- Setup time: 0 to 1 minutes
- Playing time: No limit
- Chance: Low
- Skills: Running, stalking, hiding, observation
- Materials required: None

Tag (also called chase, tig, it, tiggy, tips, tick, on-on and tip) is a playground game involving one or more players chasing other players in an attempt to "tag" and mark them out of play, typically by touching with a hand. There are many variations; most forms have no teams, scores, or equipment. Usually when a person is tagged, the tagger says, "It!", "Tag, you're 'It'!" or "Tag". The last one tagged during tag is "It" for the next round. The game is known by other names in various parts of the world, including "running and catching" in India, "catch and cook" in the Middle East, "lelu" in Vanuatu, and "berek" in Poland.

== Origin of name ==
The game has many different names in different parts of the UK: 'tig' in Yorkshire, Scotland, and in the North West of England; and 'it' in the South of England. In the United States the game is usually called 'tag', and in Australia it is sometimes called 'chasey' or 'tips'.

In 2018, the internet meme "How old were you when you found out ____" began circulating, which stated that the origin of the word tag was an acronym meaning 'touch and go'. Investigation by snopes.com found this to be false. According to the Merriam-Webster dictionary, the origin of the name 'tag' is unknown, while the Oxford Dictionary of English speculates it to be a variant of 'tig', which itself is possibly a variant of 'tick'.

== History ==
Tag-like games have been played throughout history since as far back as at least the fourth century BC. The Ancient Greek poet Erinna, in her poem The Distaff, speaks of a tag-like game where one kid, the "tortoise", chases other kids, and the tagged kid becomes the new "tortoise". (See also: Ostracinda)

=== Indian variations of tag ===
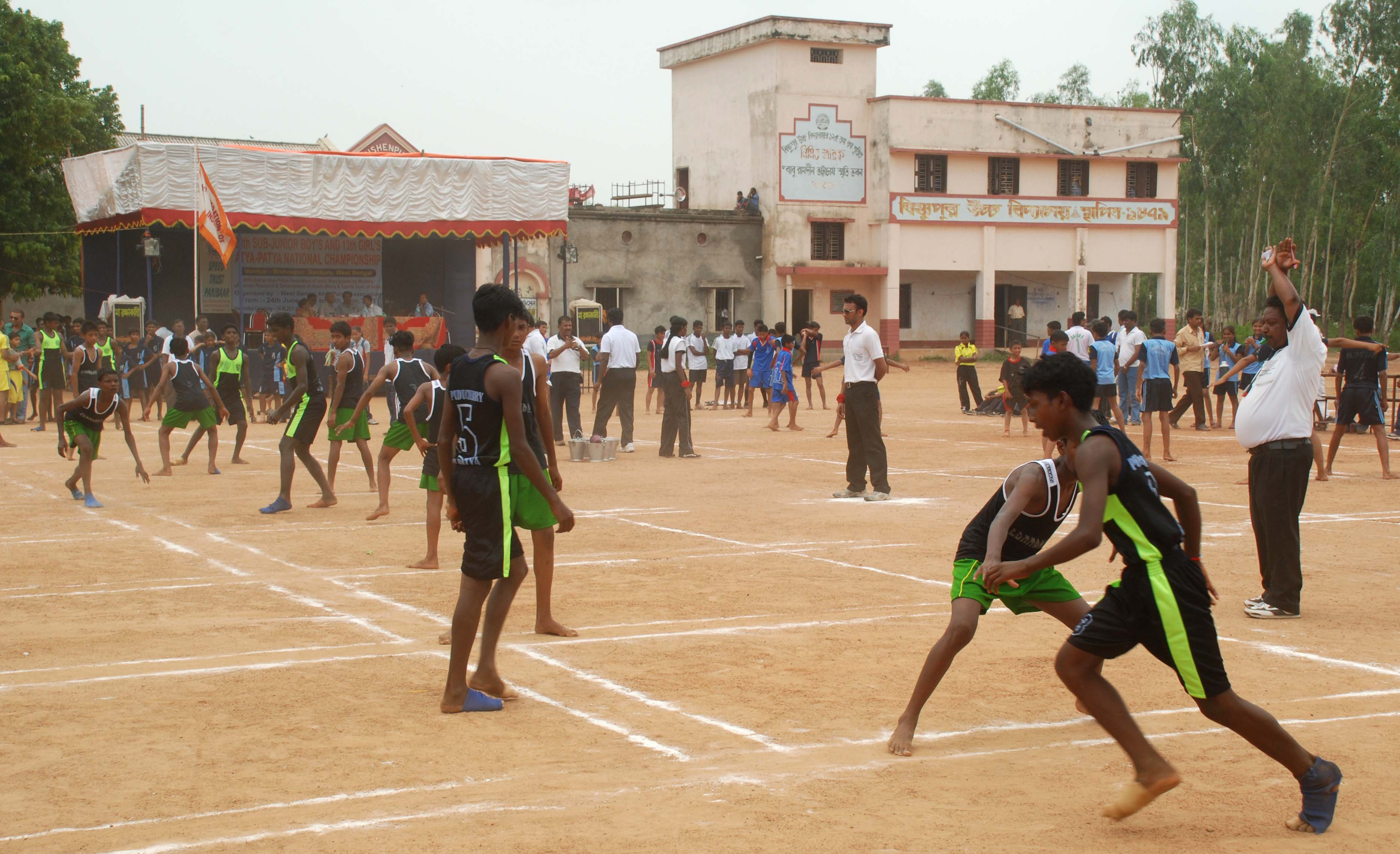
An atya-patya player (front right) attempts to cross the lane guarded by a tagger (right). Variations of atya-patya are played across South and Southeast Asia, such as the Malaysian galah panjang.

- Kho-kho has been played since at least the fourth century BC. Certain aspects of kho-kho and kabaddi are believed to have been mentioned in the Mahabharata, around 300 AD or before.
- Atya-patya, which goes by several other names (such as Klithatu), was also mentioned as early as 300 AD or before in the Naṟṟiṇai.
- Langdi is believed to have been played in the Pandya dynasty, over a thousand years ago.

Some Indian variations of tag are theorized to represent certain things from ancient Indian history; for example, there is evidence to suggest that the traditional Bengali game of gollachut, in which players attempt to run out of a circular field without being tagged by opponents, may represent escape attempts by agricultural slaves during the Indus Valley Civilization.

=== Modern history ===
In early 2020, as the COVID-19 pandemic began to spread globally, descriptions arose on social media of children playing variations of tag which involved roleplaying spreading coronavirus.

==== Tag competitions ====
Major modern competitions for tag-like games ("major competitions" being those with at least 100 million views) include World Chase Tag, Pro Kabaddi League, and Ultimate Kho Kho. As for tag variants being included in prestigious events, kabaddi has found its way into the Asian Games, and is also in the South Asian Games alongside kho-kho; both games have been proposed by the Indian government to be part of the 2036 Olympics.

== Basic rules ==
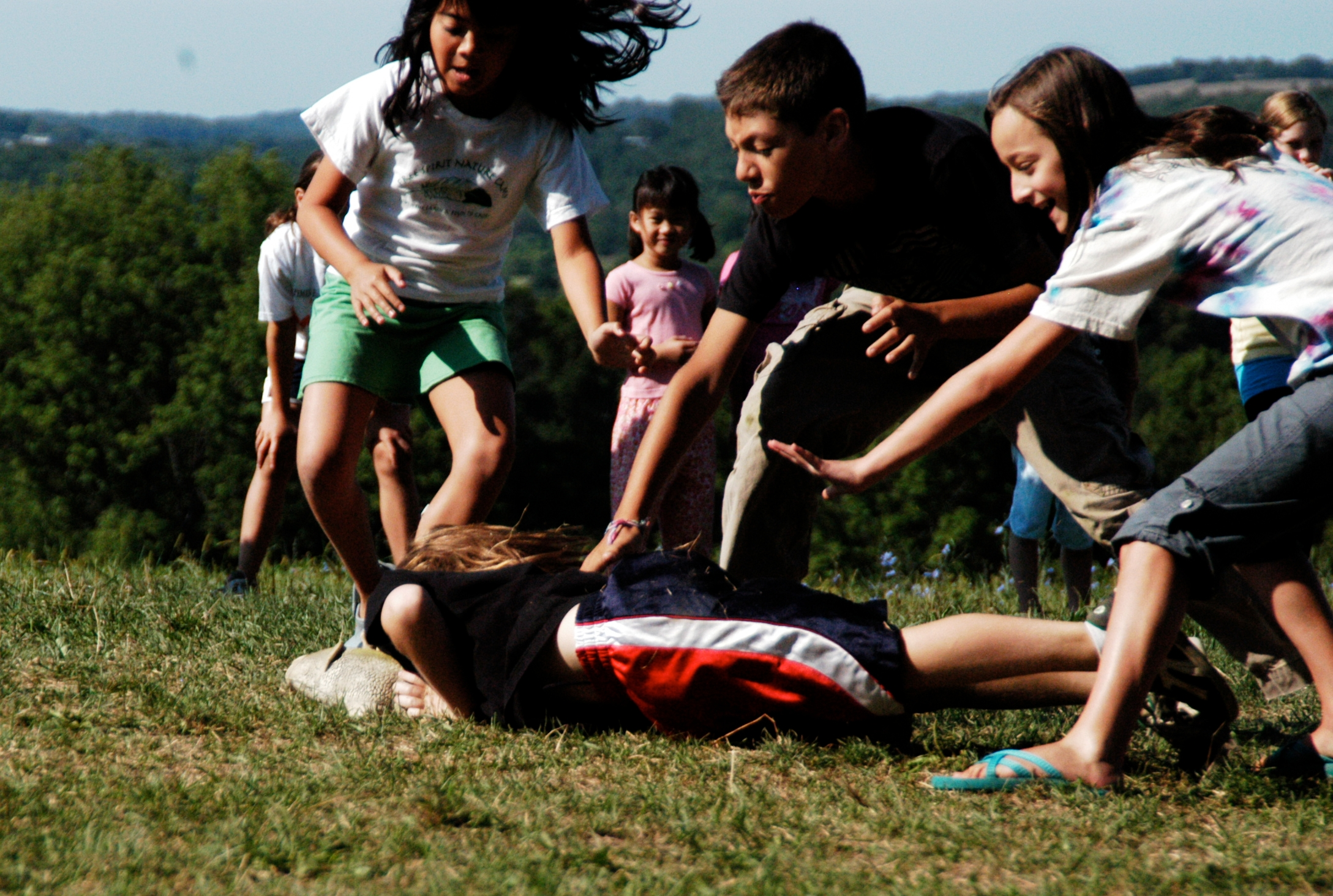
Children playing a version of tag in Westtown, New York, U.S. in 2008

Players (two or more) decide who is going to be "it", often using a counting-out game such as eeny, meeny, miny, moe or rock paper scissors. The player selected to be "it" then chases the others, attempting to "Tag" one of them (by touching them with the palm of a hand) as the others try to avoid being tagged. A tag makes the tagged player "it".

=== Variations ===
Many variants modify the rules for team play or place restrictions on tagged players' behavior. A simple variation makes tag an elimination game, so that tagged players do not become 'it' and instead drop out of play. Other variants include preventing "it" from tagging someone who has only just tagged them (known as "no tag-backs", "no catch-backs", "no returns", "can't tag your master" or "can't get the butcher back"), or having to wait a set amount of time before "it" can tag people.

In other variant, the previous "it" remains as it along with the new "it", and the game ends when all players have become "it". This variation of the game is sometimes called "Family tip", "Infection Tag", "Manhunt", or "Zombie Tag".

=== Base and truce terms ===
Players may be safe from being tagged under certain circumstances: if they are within a pre-determined area, off the ground, or when touching a particular structure. Traditional variants are Wood tag (see knock on wood), Iron tag, and Stone tag, when a player is safe when touching the named material. In most cases, a player will be able to stay in that pre-determined area indefinitely, such as “house rules” including that feature. This safe zone has been called a "gool", "ghoul", or "Dell", probably a corruption of "goal". The term "gool" was first recorded in print in Massachusetts in the 1870s, and is common in the northern states of the US. Variants include gould, goul, and ghoul, and alternatives include base and home. In the United Kingdom, the base is frequently known as "den". In much of Canada and parts of the northern United States, the state or home base of being immune from tagging is known as "times" or "T", most likely as mutilation of "time out".

Players may also make themselves safe from being tagged by the use of a truce term. When playing the game tag, some may cross fingers to let others know that they, the player, cannot be tagged. Yet, this rule may come into play only if the crossing of fingers is shown; if the fingers are not shown to the person who is it, then the crossing does not count.

If a player tags the person who is currently 'it', that player generally becomes 'it'.

=== Alternative terminology ===
In some parts of Scotland, instead of saying "Tag, you're 'It'!", the call is "Tig, you're het!"

In India, the player who is "it" is referred to as the "denner".

=== Deciding who is "it" ===
In addition to games like rock paper scissors that can be used to decide who is "it", some other methods are used in different parts of the world:

- In parts of Asia, variations of a game known as pugam pugai or Saa Boo Three in India are played; in one variation, a group of three players are asked to face one of their hands upward or downward, and if one of them faces their hand in the opposite direction of the other two players, then that player is eliminated. This process then repeats with other players until finally, the last player eliminated in the final group of three is made to be "it".
- All of the players put their foot in a circle, and the last player to withdraw their foot from the circle is "it".

== Bans and restrictions ==
Tag and other chasing games have been banned in some schools in the United States due to concerns about injuries, complaints from children that it can lead to harassment and bullying, and that there is an aspect to the game that possesses an unhealthily predatory element to its nature. In 2008, a 10-year-old boy in Omaha, Nebraska, died from brain injuries suffered from falling onto a metal pole while playing tag. A school dinner lady in Dorset was left partially paralyzed after a boy playing tag ran into her in 2004; her damage claim was rejected by three Court of Appeal judges, who ruled that the boy had not broken any school rules by playing the game. In 2019, Joanne Smith, the headteacher of Rudyard Kipling Primary School & Nursery, banned the game of tag because it was too rough.

A principal who banned tag in her school criticized the game for creating a "self-esteem issue" in nominating one child as a victim, and noted that the oldest and biggest children usually dominate the game. A dislike of elimination games is another reason for banning tag. In some schools only supervised tag is allowed, sometimes with a type of tagging called butterfly tagging—a light tap on the shoulders, arms or upper back.

The president of the US National Association for Sport and Physical Education said that "tag games are not inherently bad ... teachers must modify rules, select appropriate boundaries and equipment, and make sure pupils are safe. Teachers should emphasize tag games that develop self-improvement, participation, fair play, and cooperation."

== Variants ==
=== British bulldog ===
One (or two players) starts as "bulldog", who stands in the middle of the playing area, while the other players stand at one end of the area. The aim is to run from one end of the area to the other without being caught by the bulldog. When a player is caught, they become the bulldog themself. The last player is the winner and starts as "bulldog" in the next game.

=== Cat and mouse ===
Cat and mouse is a gymnasium or playground game. Children form a circle with their hands, and two players are chosen to be the Cat and the Mouse. The Cat is trying to catch the Mouse, while the Mouse is trying to not be caught. There are many further variations.

=== Chaos tag ===
In chaos tag (also known as "ultimate tag", "ultimate it", or "Everybody is it"), any player may tag any other player. When a player is tagged they are declared "down", and must stay seated in the location where they were tagged. Once this happens, any players that were previously tagged by this newly downed player will be back up, and are allowed to resume tagging. The game ends when all but one player is "down". One version allows players to form alliances, that will dissolve once there is no one left but the allied players.

=== Chhi-chhattar ===
One player, known as the "kite", starts off inside a circle formed by all of the other players ("cocks") holding hands, and then breaks free, with the first of the other players to tag the kite becoming the kite in the next round of play.

=== Colored Ogre ===
The color ogre (いろ鬼, iro oni; alternatively: 色鬼, いろおに, or 色おに) variant is played in Japan and starts by having the "it" player, called the ogre (鬼, oni), announce a color; in some cases, the other players prompt the ogre by first asking "what are the different colors?" As soon as the ogre declares a color, the other players hurry to touch an object of that color, which makes them safe; customarily, there is a short delay of 10 seconds or less before the ogre may begin pursuing the others. In general, each player being pursued must find a separate object to touch, i.e., two or more players cannot be touching the same object, but some rule variations allow multiple players to touch the same object.

The first player caught and touched by the ogre before that player can touch the designated color becomes the ogre for the next round; alternatively, the ogre role may be rotated amongst the participants after a set number of rounds. If all players touch the color before the ogre can catch anyone, the ogre role does not change, and they then announce a new color. The game is best played in an environment with a variety of colors, such as a playground, and an impartial referee may be needed to judge disputes, e.g., if a specific object being touched matches the declared color. To increase the difficulty, an object may be added to the color declaration; for example, the ogre could call out "green park bench".

=== Cross tag ===
In cross tag (also known as turn tag), if "it" is chasing somebody and then a third person runs in between, then "it" must chase the third person.

=== Duck, duck, goose ===
How duck, duck, goose is played

In this game, usually played by young children, the players sit in a circle facing inward. One player, the "picker" or "fox", walks around tapping or pointing to each player in turn, calling each of them a "duck", until finally announcing one of their choosing to be the "goose". The goose then rises and runs around the circle in the same direction as the picker, attempting to return to their seat before the "picker" can sit back down in the vacated spot. In Minnesota, this game is referred to as "Duck, duck, gray duck".

=== Elbow tag ===
This variant is played on a circular field, with an inner circle and outer boundary being demarcated. At the start of the game, two of the players are designated as the cat and the mouse respectively, with all other players becoming pitchers. The pitchers pair off and stand around the perimeter of the inner circle, with each pair holding each other by the elbow. The cat's goal is to tag the mouse; if the mouse links their elbow with one of the pitchers, then the pitcher who is not connected to the mouse disconnects from the pairing and swaps roles with the mouse. If the cat catches the mouse, then they swap roles.

In one variation of elbow tag, when a mouse links their elbow with one of the pitchers, the pitcher who disconnects from the pairing becomes a cat, and the previous cat becomes a mouse.

The same game is known as 'standing kho-kho' in South Asia, a variation of the Indian tag variant kho-kho. In the 'standing kho-kho' variant, players simply stand in front of or behind each other as opposed to hooking their elbows together.

=== Four corners ===
There are multiple variations of four corners; in one variation, four players stand at four corners of a square, and attempt to swap corners with each other without being tagged by "it", who stands in the middle of the square.

==== Tiger ====
Players stand or sit in a circle and attempt to run to the other side. One person stands in the middle and is "it" or "tiger". If the "tiger" catches you, you then become the new "tiger".

=== Freeze tag ===
Freeze tag is a variation of classic tag. A fixed player is designated "it". When a person is tagged by "it", they are then "frozen" (staying still in the place where they were tagged). All "unfrozen" players still in play can then touch frozen players to "unfreeze" them, allowing them to be back in play. The game ends when "it" freezes all but one of the players who is then typically "it" during the next game. In some variations of the game, there may be multiple players who are "it" working together. Similar games are played that are known as Vish Amrut/Vish Amrit (Poison-Antidote), Lock and Key, Ice and Water, Banana Tag and Stuck in the Mud.

==== Squat tag ====
Players can make themselves safe from being tagged in squat tag by squatting down, though in order to stand back up again, a teammate has to tag the squatting player. (Note: Some similar games have players sit down rather than squat.)

=== Hang tag ===
In hang tag, players are safe from being tagged so long as they are hanging off the ground by holding onto something above them, such as a tree branch.

=== Kiss chase ===
Kiss chase, also referred to as Catch and Kiss, is a tag variant in which tagging is performed by kissing. All members of one sex are "it" at once and chase players of the opposite sex until everyone is caught, then the roles are reversed. A variant is that the player chosen to be "it" will, with assistance from players of the same gender, chase all members of the opposite sex and kiss one of them.

=== Kumir danga ===
In this Indian game, all of the players stay in a designated area ("land"), while "it" (who is referred to as a "crocodile") stands outside of that area in the "water", and cannot step onto land. The players try to run between the water and the land without being tagged.

=== Poison ===
In the game of Poison, play starts with players holding hands around a small "poison" circle marked on the ground. The first player to be pushed or pulled into the circle become "poisoned", all hands are released and the poisoned player or players must chase the others.

=== River or mountain ===
In River or Mountain (also referred to as Nadi-Parvat in India), designated areas of the field are referred to as "river" or "mountain". The player who is "it" shouts "river" or "mountain", and the other players must go to the area called out. While outside of that area, the players can be tagged and eliminated.

=== Shadow tag ===
Instead of touching other players, "it" tries to step on their shadows to tag them.

=== The floor is lava ===
In one variation of "The floor is lava", the players must avoid stepping on the floor by staying on raised platforms, while "it" (sometimes referred to as the "Lava Monster") can walk across the floor and attempt to tag other players.

=== Tilo-Express ===
Tilo-Express is a variant of hide-and-seek in which the seeker loses if they are tagged by an opponent that they have not spotted.

=== Octopus tag ===
In Octopus the playing field is known as ocean. The players, or "fishes", line up along one side of the ocean. When the Octopus calls out, "Come fishies come!", "Octopus!", or a matching attribute of one or more fishes, they try to run to the other side without getting tagged. In a variation, once the fish run to the other side without getting tagged, the game pauses until the octopus starts it again. Upon getting tagged the fish become "seaweed" and must freeze or sit where they were tagged, but they can wave their arms around and assist the Octopus in tagging other fish within their reach. The last fish to be tagged becomes the next Octopus.

== Team tag ==
=== Chicken vs eagle ===
In this game, one player is the eagle, another player is the chicken, and the remaining players are chicks. The chicks form a line behind the chicken by holding each other's waists, and the goal of the eagle is to tag the chicks, while the chicken tries to prevent this by holding their arms out and moving around. Throughout the game, the chicks must stay in the line formation, and if one of them is tagged, then they become the eagle.

=== Catch the dragon's tail ===
All the players line up by holding each other's waists, with the player in the front known as the "dragon", and the player in the back known as the "tail". The goal of the dragon is to tag the tail, while all other players aim to prevent this by moving around. The players must stay in the line formation throughout the game, and once the dragon tags the tail, the players all move up one spot, with the former dragon now at the back of the line.

=== Cops and robbers ===
Cops and robbers, sometimes called "jail", "jail tag", "team tag", "chase", "cowboys and Indians", "police and thief", "prisoner's base" "jailbreak", "releaseo" or "manhunt", has players split into two teams: cops and robbers.

A. M. Burrage calls this version of the game "Smee" in his 1931 ghost story of the same name. The cops, who are in pursuit of robbers (the team being chased), arrest the robbers by tagging the robbers and putting them in jail. Robbers can stage a jailbreak by tagging one of the prisoners in the jail without getting tagged themselves. The game ends if all the robbers are in jail. In a variant, the robbers have five minutes to hide before being hunted, and only one jailbreak may be allowed per robber. In the 2017 racing game Mario Kart 8 Deluxe, a variation of the game is used as a sub-mode for Battle Mode known as "Renegade Roundup".

In some versions, the game is more balanced, with the "Robbers" also having the ability to capture the "Cops" and take them to a "jail" as well. In these variants, the game ends when all of one team is in the other's "jail".

=== Zombie tag ===
Humans vs. Zombies is a survival game of tag, where "human" players fight off increasingly large numbers of "zombies"; if a human is "turned" (i.e. tagged), then that player also becomes a zombie. At the game's beginning, there are only one or two zombies; the zombies multiply by tagging humans, turning them into zombies after a period of one hour. Humans can defend themselves from zombies by using socks, marshmallows, Nerf Blasters or any other toys deemed safe and appropriate; if a zombie is hit by one of these, they are stunned (not allowed to interact with the game in any way) for 15 seconds. The goal of the zombies is to turn all the humans; the humans, meanwhile, must outlast all the zombies.

=== Manhunt ===
Manhunt is a mixture of hide and seek and tag, often played during the night. One person is "it", while the other players have to hide. Then, the person who is "it" tries to find and tag them. The game is over when all players are out. Manhunt is sometimes played in teams. In one variant there is a home base in which a player is safe. That version ends when all players who are not safe are out.

=== Prisoner's base ===
In prisoner's base, each team starts in a chain, holding hands, with one end of the chain touching the base. The end two players on each team break from the chain and try to tag each other, taking them to their base if they do. The end pair progressively break from the chain and join the tagging. As with Cops and Robbers, prisoners can be freed by tagging them in the base. The game is thought to date back to the Renaissance period, and may be inspired by the act of bride kidnapping. A game of prisoner's base was played by members of Lewis & Clark's Corps of Discovery against a group of Nez Perce.

=== Chain tag ===
In chain tag (also known in India as Jod Saakli or Saakli/Saakhli), one player is "it" and attempts to tag other players. Each tagged player becomes "it" as well, with all of the "it" players required to form and remain in a human chain by holding hands. Only the two players at either end of the chain can tag other players. The game ends once all players have been tagged, with the last person tagged being the winner.

=== What's the time, Mr. Wolf? ===
One player is chosen to be Mr. Wolf and stands facing away from the other players at the opposite end of the playing field. All players except Mr. Wolf chant in unison "What's the time, Mr. Wolf?", and Mr. Wolf will answer in one of two ways: Mr. Wolf may call a time – usually an hour ending in "o'clock". The other players take that many steps towards Mr. Wolf. They then ask the question again. Alternatively Mr. Wolf may call "Dinner time!", and turn and chase the other players back to their starting point. If Mr. Wolf tags a player, that player becomes Mr. Wolf for the next round.

=== Ringolevio ===
In Ringolevio, there are two teams. In one version, one team goes off and hides. The other team counts to a number such as 30 and then goes looking for them. Each team has its own "jail", a park bench or other defendable area in another version. The game goes on until all of one team is in jail. In many ways, Ringolevio is similar to Prisoner's Base.

=== Hens-Vipers-Foxes ===
There are three teams in this game: the hens, vipers, and foxes, with each team having its own designated area ("camp"). Each team can tag players of one of the other teams (i.e. hens can tag vipers, vipers tag foxes, and foxes tag hens) to imprison them within the tagging team's camp, with the prisoners only able to be freed by a tag from the third team.

=== Gella-Chutt ===
Gella-Chutt (transl. "the king ran away") is a traditional Indian game from Tripura. In the game, one team has a king stationed in a "prison", which is at a distance from the "home" area. The goal of the king is to reach home with the help of his teammates ("guards") without being tagged by the opponents.

=== Gollachut ===
In Gollachut, one team starts off in the center of a circle, and each of its players attempts to reach an area at the edge of the circle without being tagged by the opponents.

=== Surr ===
Surr is played by two teams of at least four players, in a field divided by two perpendicular "lines of defense" (lanes) into four quadrants. The attacking team gathers in one quadrant, and aims to advance around the other three quadrants without having all of its players tagged out by the defensive team's players, who must remain within the lines of defense.

== Variants requiring equipment ==
Some variants of tag use equipment such as balls, paintball guns, or even flashlights to replace tagging by hand.

=== Blind man's bluff ===
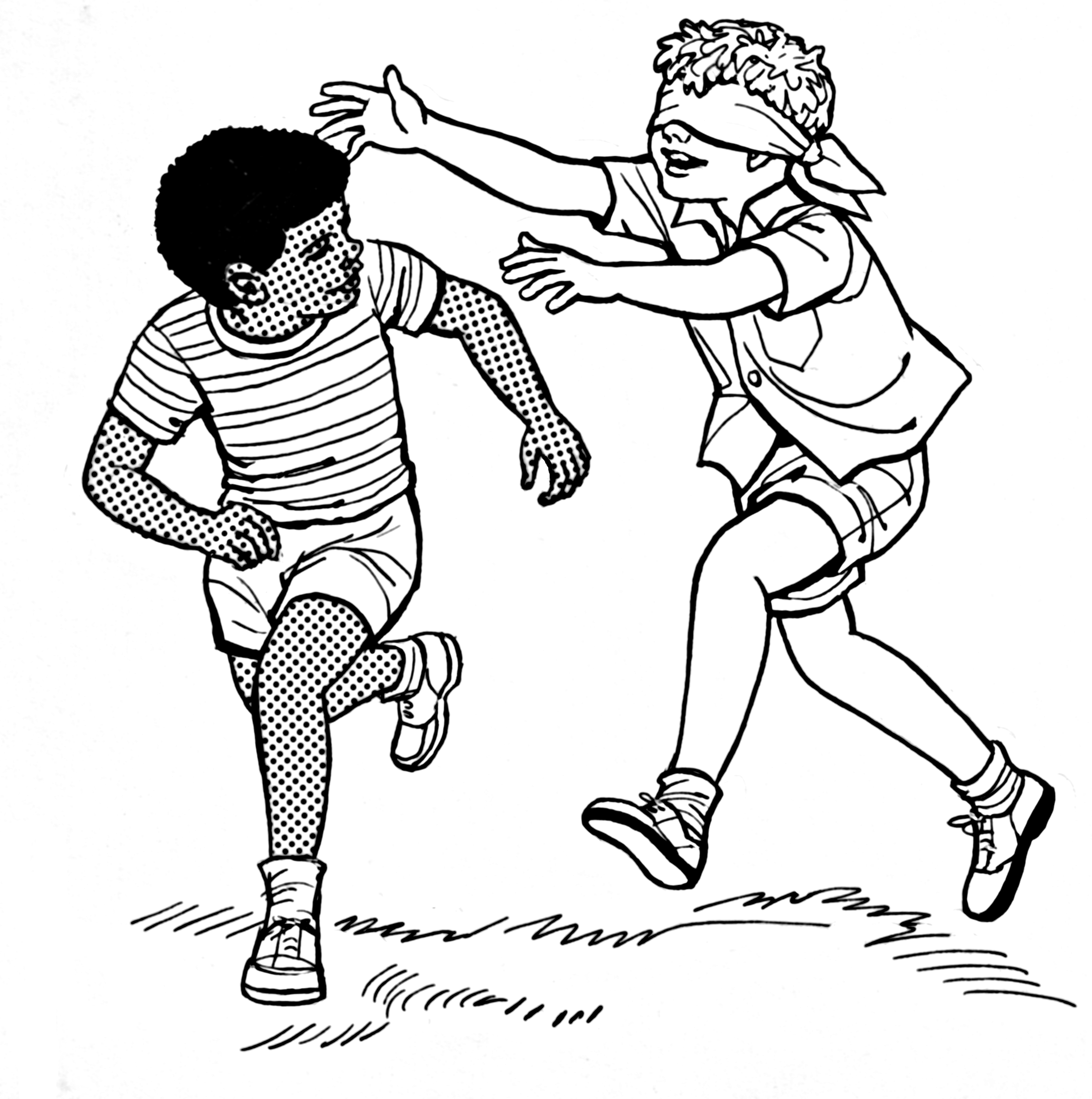
The "Blind man's bluff" variant requires a blindfold to be played.

Blind man's bluff, also known as Mr. Blind Man or Grounders, is a version of tag in which one player, designated as "it", is blindfolded and attempts to tag the other players, while the other players try to avoid them. In some variants "it" uses a stick to tag and find their way around.

=== Capture the flag ===
The field is divided into two halves, one for each team, and the goal of each team is to have its players go into enemy territory, grab the "flag" located in the back of their territory, and then make it back to friendly territory without being tagged.

=== Computer tag ===
Research students developed a version of tag played using handheld WiFi-enabled computers with GPS.

=== Flashlight tag ===
Flashlight tag, also called "Army tag", "Spotlight", and "German Spotlight", is played at night. Rather than physically tagging, the "it" player tags by shining a flashlight beam on other players.

=== Fox and geese ===
A traditional type of line tag, sometimes played in snow, is Fox and geese. The fox starts at the centre of a spoked wheel, and the geese flee from the fox along the spokes and around the wheel. Geese that are tagged become foxes. The intersections of the spokes with the wheel are safe zones.

=== Kick the can ===
One person is "it" and a can is placed in an open space. The other players run off and hide, then "it" tries to find and tag each of them. Tagged players are sent to jail. Any player who has not been caught can kick the can, setting the other players free from jail. The player who is "it" must replace the can on its designated spot before they can resume chasing and tagging other players.

=== Laser tag ===
Laser tag is similar to flashlight tag, but using special equipment to avoid the inevitable arguments that arise about whether one was actually tagged. Players carry guns that emit beams of light and wear electronic equipment that can detect the beams and register being hit. The equipment often has built-in scoring systems and various penalties for taking hits. Pay-per-game laser tag facilities are common in North America.

=== Marco Polo ===
A game similar to blind man's bluff. Players set boundaries for the game, as it is usually played outside, utilising land marks as borders. The person designated "it" is required to close their eyes or wear something to cover their eyes, and shouts "Marco!" at regular intervals; the other players must shout "Polo!" in response. "It" must use sound localization to find one of the other players and tag them. The tagged player then generally becomes "it," and the process repeats, though the next "it" may be chosen by volunteer, vote or a rotation of all players. In some variants there are rules set about types of movement allowed to make it easier or harder for "it", such as no running or climbing.

In America, it is an aquatic variant of blind man's bluff, most commonly played in a swimming pool, although it may also be played while swimming in shallow natural bodies of water (typically the areas near the shores of oceans, seas, and lakes). The players may be swimming, treading water, or walking on the bottom of the pool or body of water. In some variants, if any of the players who are not "it" climb out of the water to ensure not being caught (depending on the variant, this may be cheating) and the player designated "it" suspects this, they are to shout "Fish out of water!" and can open their eyes briefly to confirm this. If their suspicions are correct, then the culprit must become "it" as the game starts over.

=== Nalugu Rallu Aata ===
In Nalugu Rallu Aata (Four-stones game), four players stand in four quadrants of a square, with "it" restricted to moving in the borders between the quadrants. There are four stones in the middle of the square, and the objective is for each player on the team of four to get a stone and then return to their own quadrant without being tagged.

=== Paintball ===
Paintball is a sport in which players use compressed air guns (called paintball markers) to tag other players with paint-filled pellets. Games are usually played on commercial fields with a strict set of safety and gameplay rules.

=== Sock tag ===
A tube sock is filled with a small amount of flour in the toe of the sock; the sock is then gripped by the leg hole and wielded as a flail. Striking a player with any part of the sock counts as a tag. When the sock strikes the player, the impact releases enough flour to leave a mark which serves as proof that the player was tagged.

=== Steal the bacon ===
In Steal the bacon (also known as Dog and the Bone or Rumal Jhapatta in India, or steal the flingsock/handkerchief), there are two teams on opposite ends of the field, with an object placed in the center of the field. Once play begins, one player from each team attempts to grab the object and then run back to their own team's end of the field to score a point. If a player is holding the object and is tagged by an opponent, then they fail and the other team scores a point.

=== Tree-climbing monkey ===
There are several variations of and games related to "Tree climbing monkey" (such as Surparambya, Marakothi and Dand parhangrha). A team of several players attempt to climb up trees, while "it" tries to tag all of them. There is a stick in a circle on the ground, and "it" has to ensure none of the opponents touch that stick. In some similar games, such as Siya Satkana, there is no tree-climbing component to the game.

=== Tumbang preso ===
The player who is "it" guards a can placed on the ground, while one of the other players tries to throw their slipper at the can to knock it over. After throwing, players must recover their slippers and then return to the throwing area without being tagged. Before "it" can tag the players, "it" must first put the can back upright and in its original position.

== Team tag sports ==
=== South Asian variations of tag ===
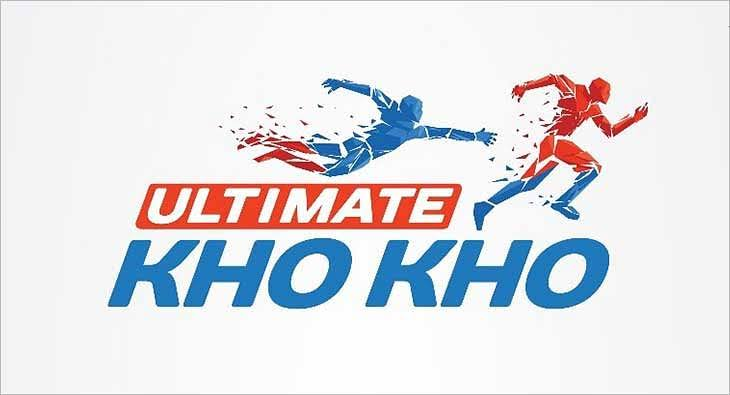
The logo for Ultimate Kho Kho, one of the biggest tag competitions in India

In South Asia, several sports are variants of tag, played at the team level, sometimes internationally.

==== Kabaddi ====
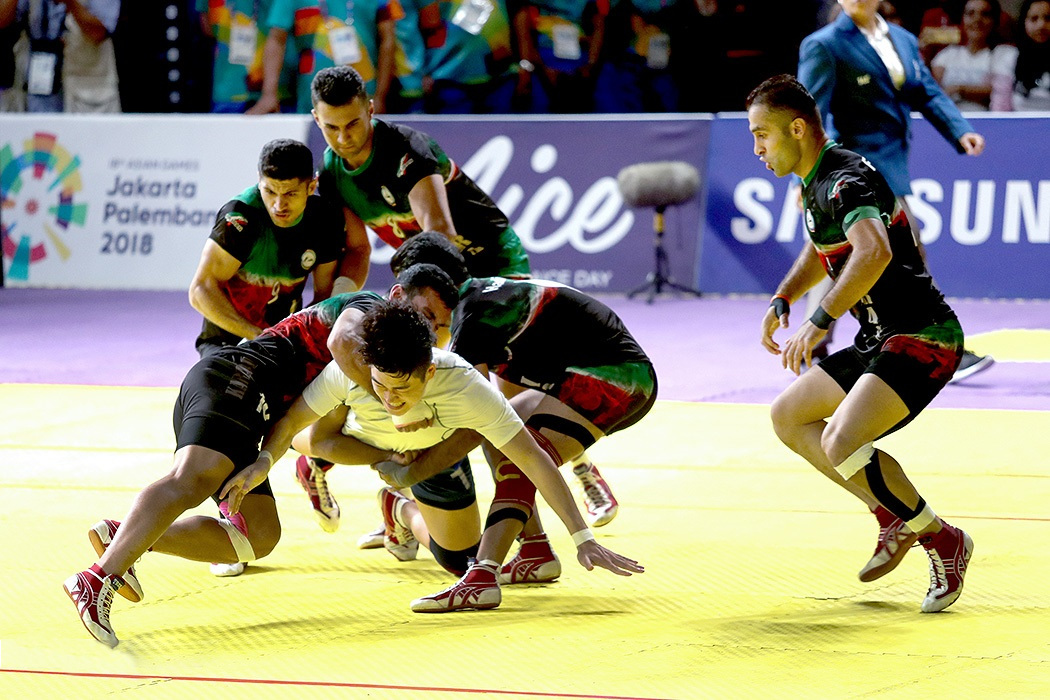
A Kabaddi raider trying to make it back over the midline while being tackled by the defensive team

In Kabaddi , raiders cross a dividing line to try to tag defenders, while continuously chanting "kabbadi" on one breath while over the line, and then attempt to make it back over the line without being stopped (tackled) by the defenders. It is included in the Asian Games and even has a world championship, being played throughout India, Pakistan, Bangladesh, Sri Lanka, and Iran, as well as by the South Asian diaspora in Canada, Great Britain, the U.S., Australia, New Zealand, and the Netherlands. It was also demonstrated in 1936 Berlin Olympics.

==== Kho kho ====
Kho kho involves an attacker trying to tag three defenders in a rectangular court. The attacker's eight teammates sit in a central lane which divides the court into two halves, and which connects two poles at either end of the court. The attacker can not cross the central lane, and can not change direction once they start running towards either pole. The attacker has the option of switching roles with a teammate by touching their back, and can also run around either pole to enter the other half of the court. Kho kho's first major professional franchise competition was the 2022 season of Ultimate Kho Kho.

==== Atya patya ====
Atya patya is played on a rectangular court, which is split into two halves by a central lane or "trench", and which is further subdivided by nine trenches which are perpendicular to the central trench. The game is played in four 7-minute innings (turns), with teams alternating offense and defense in each inning. The goal of the attacking team is to have their players cross as many trenches as possible without being eliminated by a touch from any of the nine defensive players, each of whom stands in one of the trenches.

==== Langdi ====
Langdi is played in a small rectangular court, with the teams each having two 9-minute turns on offense and defense. The offensive team has one player in the court, while the defensive team sends in a batch of three players at a time. The offensive player is restricted to hopping around on one foot, and aims to tag as many defenders as possible.

=== World Chase Tag ===
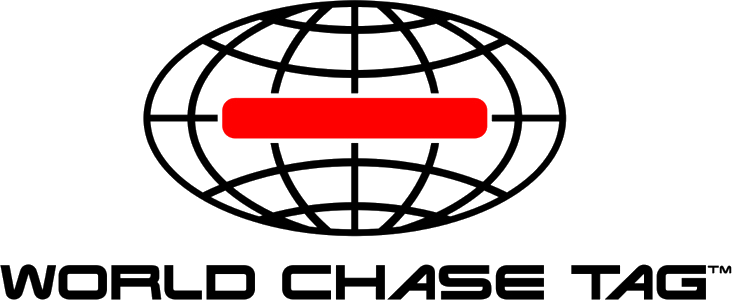

World Chase Tag (WCT) is played between two teams of six players over 16 rounds of gameplay. The playing court is a 12 m (39 ft)-square with various objects and obstacles placed within it. Parkour is a major component of how the players navigate the obstacles in the court. In each round, one player from the offensive team (the chaser) tries to tag a player from the defending team (the evader) within 20 seconds. The evader scores a point if they successfully avoid being tagged during the round.

=== Tag rugby ===
Tag or flag rugby is a non-contact variation in which each player wears a belt that has two velcro tags attached to it, or shorts with velcro patches. The mode of play is also similar to rugby league with attacking players attempting to dodge, evade and pass a rugby ball while defenders attempt to prevent them scoring by tagging – pulling a velcro attached tag from the ball carrier. Flag football has similar gameplay, and is a non-contact variation of American football, a game related to rugby. However, the "tag" in "tag rugby" is derived from the "tags" that the players wear and the children's game of tag more closely resembles touch rugby whereby a touch replaces a tackle.

== Games involving tagging ==
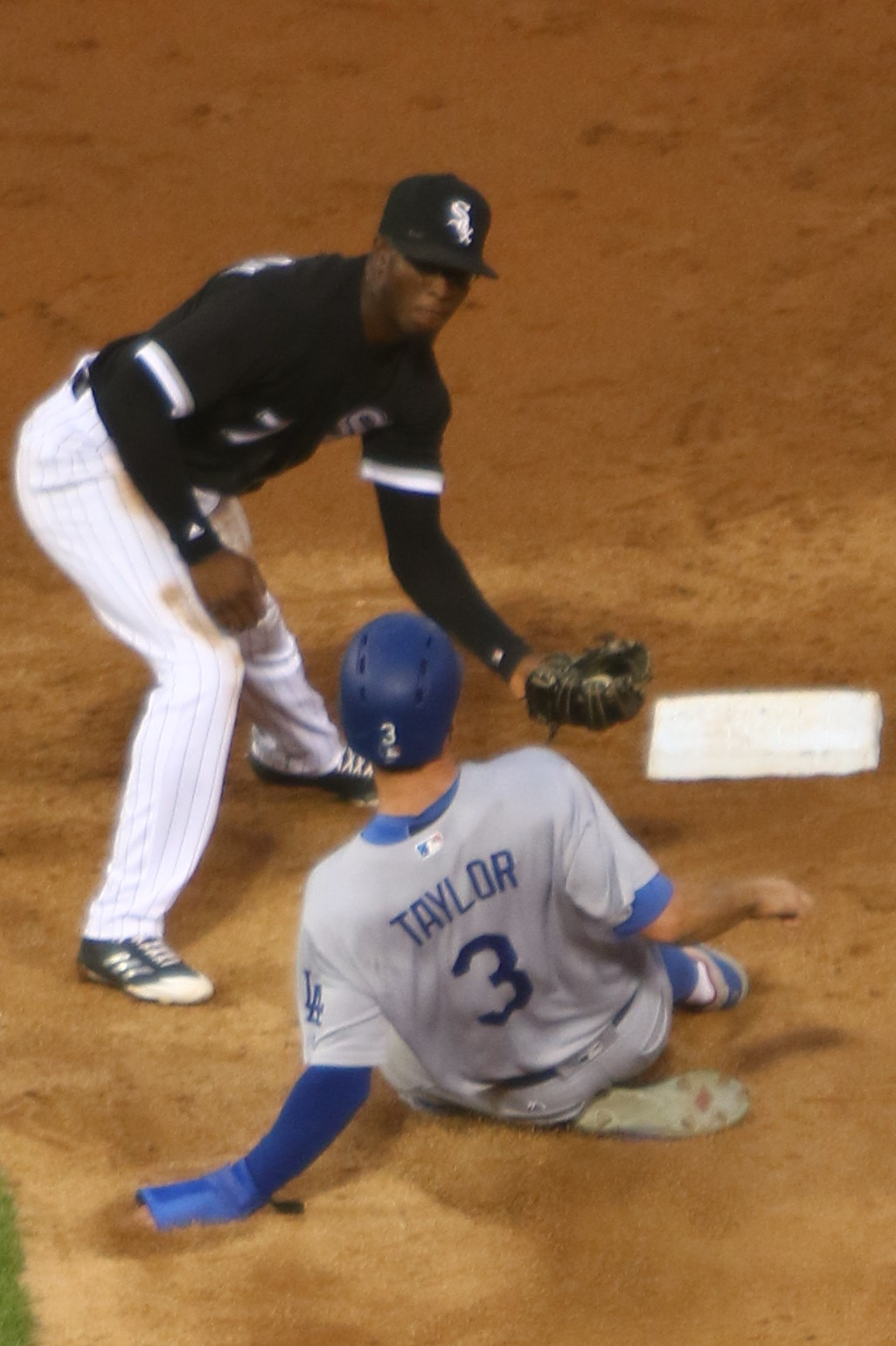
A defensive baseball player (left) tries to tag a baserunner with his glove before the runner can slide into the base.

Some sports involve tagging as a minor, but crucial component of gameplay.

=== Baseball ===
In the bat-and-ball game of baseball, the offensive team's players try to score by advancing around four bases without being put out (eliminated) by players on the defensive team. One way for a defender to put out an offensive player is to tag the offensive player (when they are not touching any of the bases) while holding the baseball.

The same mechanic is present in several variations of baseball, such as softball and Baseball5.

== Video game adaptations ==
=== Pac-Man ===
Pac-Man, originally titled Puck Man (Note: Japanese: パックマン, Hepburn: Pakkuman) in Japan, is a 1980 maze video game developed and published by Namco for arcades. It was released in Japan on May 22, 1980 and by Midway Manufacturing in North America in October 1980. The player controls Pac-Man, who must eat all the dots inside an enclosed maze while avoiding four colored ghosts. Eating large flashing dots called "Power Pellets" causes the ghosts to temporarily turn blue and vulnerable, allowing Pac-Man to eat the ghosts for bonus points.

== See also ==
- Tackle (sports concept)
- List of children's games#Tag games
- Traditional games in the Philippines#Variations of tag
- Assassin (game)
- Hide-and-seek
